

219001–219100 

|-bgcolor=#E9E9E9
| 219001 ||  || — || May 9, 2008 || Grove Creek || F. Tozzi || — || align=right | 2.4 km || 
|-id=002 bgcolor=#d6d6d6
| 219002 ||  || — || May 3, 2008 || Kitt Peak || Spacewatch || — || align=right | 3.3 km || 
|-id=003 bgcolor=#E9E9E9
| 219003 ||  || — || May 27, 2008 || Calvin-Rehoboth || Calvin–Rehoboth Obs. || — || align=right | 3.9 km || 
|-id=004 bgcolor=#d6d6d6
| 219004 ||  || — || September 20, 2008 || Mount Lemmon || Mount Lemmon Survey || — || align=right | 3.4 km || 
|-id=005 bgcolor=#d6d6d6
| 219005 ||  || — || October 2, 2008 || Mount Lemmon || Mount Lemmon Survey || — || align=right | 4.1 km || 
|-id=006 bgcolor=#E9E9E9
| 219006 ||  || — || October 6, 2008 || Catalina || CSS || EUN || align=right | 1.7 km || 
|-id=007 bgcolor=#E9E9E9
| 219007 ||  || — || December 19, 2008 || Bisei SG Center || BATTeRS || — || align=right | 2.5 km || 
|-id=008 bgcolor=#d6d6d6
| 219008 ||  || — || December 23, 2008 || Piszkéstető || K. Sárneczky || — || align=right | 4.4 km || 
|-id=009 bgcolor=#fefefe
| 219009 ||  || — || April 27, 2009 || Catalina || CSS || V || align=right data-sort-value="0.98" | 980 m || 
|-id=010 bgcolor=#E9E9E9
| 219010 ||  || — || June 28, 2009 || La Sagra || OAM Obs. || — || align=right | 1.6 km || 
|-id=011 bgcolor=#d6d6d6
| 219011 || 2734 P-L || — || September 24, 1960 || Palomar || PLS || THM || align=right | 2.8 km || 
|-id=012 bgcolor=#d6d6d6
| 219012 || 4762 P-L || — || September 24, 1960 || Palomar || PLS || EOS || align=right | 3.6 km || 
|-id=013 bgcolor=#E9E9E9
| 219013 || 6253 P-L || — || September 24, 1960 || Palomar || PLS || NEM || align=right | 3.0 km || 
|-id=014 bgcolor=#fefefe
| 219014 || 6768 P-L || — || September 24, 1960 || Palomar || PLS || NYS || align=right data-sort-value="0.81" | 810 m || 
|-id=015 bgcolor=#fefefe
| 219015 || 1531 T-2 || — || September 29, 1973 || Palomar || PLS || — || align=right data-sort-value="0.69" | 690 m || 
|-id=016 bgcolor=#fefefe
| 219016 || 3191 T-2 || — || September 30, 1973 || Palomar || PLS || — || align=right | 1.2 km || 
|-id=017 bgcolor=#E9E9E9
| 219017 || 3156 T-3 || — || October 16, 1977 || Palomar || PLS || — || align=right | 1.3 km || 
|-id=018 bgcolor=#fefefe
| 219018 || 4219 T-3 || — || October 16, 1977 || Palomar || PLS || NYS || align=right data-sort-value="0.90" | 900 m || 
|-id=019 bgcolor=#E9E9E9
| 219019 ||  || — || March 1, 1981 || Siding Spring || S. J. Bus || — || align=right | 3.7 km || 
|-id=020 bgcolor=#d6d6d6
| 219020 ||  || — || March 6, 1981 || Siding Spring || S. J. Bus || — || align=right | 5.0 km || 
|-id=021 bgcolor=#FFC2E0
| 219021 || 1991 LH || — || June 14, 1991 || Kitt Peak || Spacewatch || APO +1km || align=right | 1.5 km || 
|-id=022 bgcolor=#E9E9E9
| 219022 ||  || — || March 21, 1993 || La Silla || UESAC || DOR || align=right | 3.2 km || 
|-id=023 bgcolor=#d6d6d6
| 219023 ||  || — || September 15, 1993 || La Silla || E. W. Elst || — || align=right | 3.7 km || 
|-id=024 bgcolor=#d6d6d6
| 219024 ||  || — || October 9, 1993 || La Silla || E. W. Elst || — || align=right | 4.5 km || 
|-id=025 bgcolor=#d6d6d6
| 219025 ||  || — || October 9, 1993 || La Silla || E. W. Elst || — || align=right | 4.1 km || 
|-id=026 bgcolor=#E9E9E9
| 219026 ||  || — || April 3, 1994 || Kitt Peak || Spacewatch || — || align=right | 3.1 km || 
|-id=027 bgcolor=#E9E9E9
| 219027 ||  || — || April 6, 1994 || Kitt Peak || Spacewatch || — || align=right | 2.0 km || 
|-id=028 bgcolor=#fefefe
| 219028 || 1994 KE || — || May 17, 1994 || Kitt Peak || Spacewatch || ERI || align=right | 1.7 km || 
|-id=029 bgcolor=#fefefe
| 219029 ||  || — || September 5, 1994 || Kitt Peak || Spacewatch || MAS || align=right | 1.1 km || 
|-id=030 bgcolor=#E9E9E9
| 219030 ||  || — || October 13, 1994 || Kitt Peak || Spacewatch || — || align=right | 2.2 km || 
|-id=031 bgcolor=#d6d6d6
| 219031 ||  || — || November 28, 1994 || Kitt Peak || Spacewatch || — || align=right | 3.5 km || 
|-id=032 bgcolor=#fefefe
| 219032 ||  || — || March 2, 1995 || Kitt Peak || Spacewatch || — || align=right data-sort-value="0.77" | 770 m || 
|-id=033 bgcolor=#d6d6d6
| 219033 ||  || — || March 23, 1995 || Kitt Peak || Spacewatch || HYG || align=right | 4.6 km || 
|-id=034 bgcolor=#d6d6d6
| 219034 ||  || — || March 23, 1995 || Kitt Peak || Spacewatch || THM || align=right | 3.0 km || 
|-id=035 bgcolor=#E9E9E9
| 219035 ||  || — || March 27, 1995 || Kitt Peak || Spacewatch || — || align=right | 1.4 km || 
|-id=036 bgcolor=#d6d6d6
| 219036 ||  || — || April 6, 1995 || Kitt Peak || Spacewatch || — || align=right | 3.2 km || 
|-id=037 bgcolor=#E9E9E9
| 219037 ||  || — || July 27, 1995 || Kitt Peak || Spacewatch || — || align=right | 2.8 km || 
|-id=038 bgcolor=#fefefe
| 219038 || 1995 SK || — || September 17, 1995 || Ondřejov || L. Kotková || PHO || align=right | 1.6 km || 
|-id=039 bgcolor=#fefefe
| 219039 ||  || — || September 18, 1995 || Kitt Peak || Spacewatch || — || align=right | 1.1 km || 
|-id=040 bgcolor=#E9E9E9
| 219040 ||  || — || September 22, 1995 || Kitt Peak || Spacewatch || AST || align=right | 2.1 km || 
|-id=041 bgcolor=#E9E9E9
| 219041 ||  || — || September 25, 1995 || Kitt Peak || Spacewatch || — || align=right | 2.9 km || 
|-id=042 bgcolor=#E9E9E9
| 219042 ||  || — || September 26, 1995 || Kitt Peak || Spacewatch || — || align=right | 3.2 km || 
|-id=043 bgcolor=#fefefe
| 219043 ||  || — || September 25, 1995 || Kitt Peak || Spacewatch || NYS || align=right data-sort-value="0.62" | 620 m || 
|-id=044 bgcolor=#E9E9E9
| 219044 ||  || — || September 21, 1995 || Kitt Peak || Spacewatch || MRX || align=right | 1.4 km || 
|-id=045 bgcolor=#E9E9E9
| 219045 ||  || — || October 17, 1995 || Kitt Peak || Spacewatch || — || align=right | 3.6 km || 
|-id=046 bgcolor=#fefefe
| 219046 ||  || — || October 16, 1995 || Kitt Peak || Spacewatch || — || align=right data-sort-value="0.89" | 890 m || 
|-id=047 bgcolor=#fefefe
| 219047 ||  || — || October 16, 1995 || Kitt Peak || Spacewatch || — || align=right data-sort-value="0.73" | 730 m || 
|-id=048 bgcolor=#fefefe
| 219048 ||  || — || November 14, 1995 || Kitt Peak || Spacewatch || — || align=right data-sort-value="0.94" | 940 m || 
|-id=049 bgcolor=#fefefe
| 219049 ||  || — || November 15, 1995 || Kitt Peak || Spacewatch || NYS || align=right data-sort-value="0.75" | 750 m || 
|-id=050 bgcolor=#fefefe
| 219050 ||  || — || November 17, 1995 || Kitt Peak || Spacewatch || — || align=right | 1.2 km || 
|-id=051 bgcolor=#fefefe
| 219051 ||  || — || November 18, 1995 || Kitt Peak || Spacewatch || — || align=right | 1.2 km || 
|-id=052 bgcolor=#d6d6d6
| 219052 ||  || — || December 14, 1995 || Kitt Peak || Spacewatch || — || align=right | 3.9 km || 
|-id=053 bgcolor=#fefefe
| 219053 ||  || — || January 19, 1996 || Kitt Peak || Spacewatch || — || align=right | 1.3 km || 
|-id=054 bgcolor=#d6d6d6
| 219054 ||  || — || January 24, 1996 || Kitt Peak || Spacewatch || EOS || align=right | 3.1 km || 
|-id=055 bgcolor=#d6d6d6
| 219055 ||  || — || January 24, 1996 || Kitt Peak || Spacewatch || — || align=right | 4.5 km || 
|-id=056 bgcolor=#fefefe
| 219056 ||  || — || March 12, 1996 || Kitt Peak || Spacewatch || — || align=right | 1.0 km || 
|-id=057 bgcolor=#C2FFFF
| 219057 ||  || — || September 12, 1996 || La Silla || UDTS || L4 || align=right | 17 km || 
|-id=058 bgcolor=#fefefe
| 219058 ||  || — || October 5, 1996 || Kitt Peak || Spacewatch || FLO || align=right data-sort-value="0.84" | 840 m || 
|-id=059 bgcolor=#E9E9E9
| 219059 ||  || — || October 10, 1996 || Kitt Peak || Spacewatch || — || align=right | 2.0 km || 
|-id=060 bgcolor=#E9E9E9
| 219060 ||  || — || October 11, 1996 || Kitt Peak || Spacewatch || — || align=right | 2.2 km || 
|-id=061 bgcolor=#E9E9E9
| 219061 ||  || — || October 5, 1996 || La Silla || E. W. Elst || — || align=right | 4.1 km || 
|-id=062 bgcolor=#E9E9E9
| 219062 ||  || — || November 5, 1996 || Kitt Peak || Spacewatch || — || align=right | 1.9 km || 
|-id=063 bgcolor=#E9E9E9
| 219063 ||  || — || December 14, 1996 || Kitt Peak || Spacewatch || — || align=right | 1.9 km || 
|-id=064 bgcolor=#fefefe
| 219064 ||  || — || February 13, 1997 || Kitt Peak || Spacewatch || — || align=right | 1.2 km || 
|-id=065 bgcolor=#d6d6d6
| 219065 ||  || — || March 3, 1997 || Kitt Peak || Spacewatch || KOR || align=right | 1.9 km || 
|-id=066 bgcolor=#fefefe
| 219066 ||  || — || March 11, 1997 || Socorro || LINEAR || — || align=right | 1.2 km || 
|-id=067 bgcolor=#fefefe
| 219067 Bossuet ||  ||  || May 3, 1997 || La Silla || E. W. Elst || — || align=right | 1.3 km || 
|-id=068 bgcolor=#E9E9E9
| 219068 ||  || — || October 2, 1997 || Kitt Peak || Spacewatch || EUN || align=right | 1.5 km || 
|-id=069 bgcolor=#E9E9E9
| 219069 ||  || — || October 3, 1997 || Kitt Peak || Spacewatch || — || align=right | 1.4 km || 
|-id=070 bgcolor=#C2FFFF
| 219070 ||  || — || October 3, 1997 || Kitt Peak || Spacewatch || L4 || align=right | 12 km || 
|-id=071 bgcolor=#FFC2E0
| 219071 ||  || — || October 30, 1997 || Socorro || LINEAR || APO +1km || align=right data-sort-value="0.66" | 660 m || 
|-id=072 bgcolor=#E9E9E9
| 219072 ||  || — || December 29, 1997 || Haleakala || NEAT || — || align=right | 1.7 km || 
|-id=073 bgcolor=#E9E9E9
| 219073 ||  || — || December 29, 1997 || Kitt Peak || Spacewatch || — || align=right | 2.1 km || 
|-id=074 bgcolor=#E9E9E9
| 219074 ||  || — || January 26, 1998 || Kitt Peak || Spacewatch || — || align=right | 1.9 km || 
|-id=075 bgcolor=#E9E9E9
| 219075 ||  || — || January 23, 1998 || Kitt Peak || Spacewatch || — || align=right | 2.1 km || 
|-id=076 bgcolor=#E9E9E9
| 219076 ||  || — || February 24, 1998 || Kitt Peak || Spacewatch || — || align=right | 2.3 km || 
|-id=077 bgcolor=#E9E9E9
| 219077 ||  || — || March 24, 1998 || Socorro || LINEAR || MIT || align=right | 5.7 km || 
|-id=078 bgcolor=#E9E9E9
| 219078 ||  || — || April 3, 1998 || Teide || Teide Obs. || — || align=right | 2.3 km || 
|-id=079 bgcolor=#E9E9E9
| 219079 ||  || — || April 17, 1998 || Kitt Peak || Spacewatch || GEF || align=right | 1.8 km || 
|-id=080 bgcolor=#fefefe
| 219080 ||  || — || May 18, 1998 || Kitt Peak || Spacewatch || — || align=right data-sort-value="0.87" | 870 m || 
|-id=081 bgcolor=#fefefe
| 219081 ||  || — || July 26, 1998 || La Silla || E. W. Elst || — || align=right | 1.3 km || 
|-id=082 bgcolor=#d6d6d6
| 219082 ||  || — || August 17, 1998 || Socorro || LINEAR || — || align=right | 3.6 km || 
|-id=083 bgcolor=#d6d6d6
| 219083 ||  || — || August 30, 1998 || Kitt Peak || Spacewatch || EOS || align=right | 2.1 km || 
|-id=084 bgcolor=#fefefe
| 219084 ||  || — || August 26, 1998 || Kitt Peak || Spacewatch || MAS || align=right | 1.2 km || 
|-id=085 bgcolor=#d6d6d6
| 219085 ||  || — || August 24, 1998 || Socorro || LINEAR || — || align=right | 5.8 km || 
|-id=086 bgcolor=#d6d6d6
| 219086 ||  || — || August 24, 1998 || Socorro || LINEAR || — || align=right | 6.4 km || 
|-id=087 bgcolor=#d6d6d6
| 219087 ||  || — || August 24, 1998 || Socorro || LINEAR || — || align=right | 6.6 km || 
|-id=088 bgcolor=#d6d6d6
| 219088 ||  || — || August 26, 1998 || La Silla || E. W. Elst || ALA || align=right | 6.0 km || 
|-id=089 bgcolor=#fefefe
| 219089 ||  || — || August 23, 1998 || Socorro || LINEAR || ERI || align=right | 2.3 km || 
|-id=090 bgcolor=#d6d6d6
| 219090 ||  || — || September 1, 1998 || Modra || A. Galád, J. Tóth || — || align=right | 4.7 km || 
|-id=091 bgcolor=#fefefe
| 219091 ||  || — || September 15, 1998 || Sormano || P. Sicoli, A. Testa || — || align=right | 1.7 km || 
|-id=092 bgcolor=#d6d6d6
| 219092 ||  || — || September 15, 1998 || Kitt Peak || Spacewatch || THM || align=right | 2.9 km || 
|-id=093 bgcolor=#FA8072
| 219093 ||  || — || September 14, 1998 || Socorro || LINEAR || — || align=right | 1.7 km || 
|-id=094 bgcolor=#d6d6d6
| 219094 ||  || — || September 14, 1998 || Socorro || LINEAR || VER || align=right | 5.4 km || 
|-id=095 bgcolor=#d6d6d6
| 219095 ||  || — || September 16, 1998 || Caussols || ODAS || Tj (2.97) || align=right | 5.2 km || 
|-id=096 bgcolor=#fefefe
| 219096 ||  || — || September 18, 1998 || Catalina || CSS || PHO || align=right | 1.9 km || 
|-id=097 bgcolor=#fefefe
| 219097 ||  || — || September 18, 1998 || Caussols || ODAS || NYS || align=right data-sort-value="0.85" | 850 m || 
|-id=098 bgcolor=#d6d6d6
| 219098 ||  || — || September 16, 1998 || Kitt Peak || Spacewatch || — || align=right | 5.5 km || 
|-id=099 bgcolor=#fefefe
| 219099 ||  || — || September 20, 1998 || Kitt Peak || Spacewatch || — || align=right data-sort-value="0.96" | 960 m || 
|-id=100 bgcolor=#d6d6d6
| 219100 ||  || — || September 20, 1998 || Kitt Peak || Spacewatch || — || align=right | 6.0 km || 
|}

219101–219200 

|-bgcolor=#fefefe
| 219101 ||  || — || September 17, 1998 || Anderson Mesa || LONEOS || NYS || align=right data-sort-value="0.94" | 940 m || 
|-id=102 bgcolor=#fefefe
| 219102 ||  || — || September 24, 1998 || Kleť || Kleť Obs. || — || align=right | 1.5 km || 
|-id=103 bgcolor=#d6d6d6
| 219103 ||  || — || September 25, 1998 || Kitt Peak || Spacewatch || — || align=right | 3.2 km || 
|-id=104 bgcolor=#d6d6d6
| 219104 ||  || — || September 25, 1998 || Kitt Peak || Spacewatch || — || align=right | 4.9 km || 
|-id=105 bgcolor=#d6d6d6
| 219105 ||  || — || September 27, 1998 || Kitt Peak || Spacewatch || THM || align=right | 3.1 km || 
|-id=106 bgcolor=#d6d6d6
| 219106 ||  || — || September 25, 1998 || Kitt Peak || Spacewatch || — || align=right | 3.5 km || 
|-id=107 bgcolor=#d6d6d6
| 219107 ||  || — || September 26, 1998 || Kitt Peak || Spacewatch || — || align=right | 3.4 km || 
|-id=108 bgcolor=#fefefe
| 219108 ||  || — || September 26, 1998 || Kitt Peak || Spacewatch || ERI || align=right | 3.6 km || 
|-id=109 bgcolor=#fefefe
| 219109 ||  || — || September 20, 1998 || La Silla || E. W. Elst || — || align=right | 3.0 km || 
|-id=110 bgcolor=#fefefe
| 219110 ||  || — || September 21, 1998 || La Silla || E. W. Elst || FLO || align=right | 1.00 km || 
|-id=111 bgcolor=#d6d6d6
| 219111 ||  || — || September 21, 1998 || La Silla || E. W. Elst || — || align=right | 3.7 km || 
|-id=112 bgcolor=#fefefe
| 219112 ||  || — || September 26, 1998 || Socorro || LINEAR || KLI || align=right | 2.1 km || 
|-id=113 bgcolor=#d6d6d6
| 219113 ||  || — || September 26, 1998 || Socorro || LINEAR || — || align=right | 4.6 km || 
|-id=114 bgcolor=#fefefe
| 219114 ||  || — || September 26, 1998 || Socorro || LINEAR || NYS || align=right data-sort-value="0.83" | 830 m || 
|-id=115 bgcolor=#d6d6d6
| 219115 ||  || — || September 26, 1998 || Socorro || LINEAR || HYG || align=right | 4.0 km || 
|-id=116 bgcolor=#d6d6d6
| 219116 ||  || — || September 26, 1998 || Socorro || LINEAR || — || align=right | 3.9 km || 
|-id=117 bgcolor=#d6d6d6
| 219117 ||  || — || September 26, 1998 || Socorro || LINEAR || — || align=right | 5.2 km || 
|-id=118 bgcolor=#d6d6d6
| 219118 ||  || — || September 26, 1998 || Socorro || LINEAR || — || align=right | 3.1 km || 
|-id=119 bgcolor=#d6d6d6
| 219119 ||  || — || September 26, 1998 || Socorro || LINEAR || HYG || align=right | 3.8 km || 
|-id=120 bgcolor=#fefefe
| 219120 ||  || — || September 26, 1998 || Socorro || LINEAR || NYS || align=right | 1.1 km || 
|-id=121 bgcolor=#fefefe
| 219121 ||  || — || September 26, 1998 || Socorro || LINEAR || — || align=right | 1.4 km || 
|-id=122 bgcolor=#d6d6d6
| 219122 ||  || — || October 13, 1998 || Kitt Peak || Spacewatch || — || align=right | 3.9 km || 
|-id=123 bgcolor=#fefefe
| 219123 ||  || — || October 15, 1998 || Caussols || ODAS || NYS || align=right | 1.0 km || 
|-id=124 bgcolor=#d6d6d6
| 219124 ||  || — || October 15, 1998 || Kitt Peak || Spacewatch || EOS || align=right | 2.6 km || 
|-id=125 bgcolor=#C2FFFF
| 219125 ||  || — || October 17, 1998 || Kitt Peak || Spacewatch || L4 || align=right | 14 km || 
|-id=126 bgcolor=#fefefe
| 219126 ||  || — || October 23, 1998 || Caussols || ODAS || — || align=right | 1.1 km || 
|-id=127 bgcolor=#d6d6d6
| 219127 ||  || — || October 28, 1998 || Socorro || LINEAR || — || align=right | 4.5 km || 
|-id=128 bgcolor=#fefefe
| 219128 ||  || — || October 25, 1998 || Cima Ekar || Asiago Obs. || PHO || align=right | 2.2 km || 
|-id=129 bgcolor=#fefefe
| 219129 ||  || — || October 20, 1998 || Xinglong || SCAP || — || align=right | 1.1 km || 
|-id=130 bgcolor=#d6d6d6
| 219130 ||  || — || October 28, 1998 || Socorro || LINEAR || — || align=right | 5.4 km || 
|-id=131 bgcolor=#d6d6d6
| 219131 ||  || — || October 28, 1998 || Socorro || LINEAR || — || align=right | 4.7 km || 
|-id=132 bgcolor=#fefefe
| 219132 ||  || — || November 11, 1998 || Nachi-Katsuura || Y. Shimizu, T. Urata || — || align=right | 2.5 km || 
|-id=133 bgcolor=#d6d6d6
| 219133 ||  || — || November 10, 1998 || Socorro || LINEAR || — || align=right | 6.6 km || 
|-id=134 bgcolor=#d6d6d6
| 219134 ||  || — || November 14, 1998 || Kitt Peak || Spacewatch || — || align=right | 3.9 km || 
|-id=135 bgcolor=#fefefe
| 219135 ||  || — || November 15, 1998 || Kitt Peak || Spacewatch || NYS || align=right | 1.00 km || 
|-id=136 bgcolor=#fefefe
| 219136 ||  || — || November 14, 1998 || Kitt Peak || Spacewatch || MAS || align=right | 1.1 km || 
|-id=137 bgcolor=#fefefe
| 219137 ||  || — || November 21, 1998 || Bergisch Gladbach || W. Bickel || NYS || align=right | 1.0 km || 
|-id=138 bgcolor=#d6d6d6
| 219138 ||  || — || November 21, 1998 || Socorro || LINEAR || — || align=right | 7.2 km || 
|-id=139 bgcolor=#C2FFFF
| 219139 ||  || — || November 18, 1998 || Kitt Peak || M. W. Buie || L4 || align=right | 11 km || 
|-id=140 bgcolor=#C2FFFF
| 219140 ||  || — || November 22, 1998 || Kitt Peak || Spacewatch || L4 || align=right | 12 km || 
|-id=141 bgcolor=#C2FFFF
| 219141 ||  || — || December 8, 1998 || Kitt Peak || Spacewatch || L4 || align=right | 16 km || 
|-id=142 bgcolor=#fefefe
| 219142 ||  || — || December 15, 1998 || Caussols || ODAS || — || align=right | 1.4 km || 
|-id=143 bgcolor=#fefefe
| 219143 ||  || — || December 14, 1998 || Socorro || LINEAR || PHO || align=right | 1.6 km || 
|-id=144 bgcolor=#d6d6d6
| 219144 ||  || — || December 10, 1998 || Kitt Peak || Spacewatch || — || align=right | 5.1 km || 
|-id=145 bgcolor=#E9E9E9
| 219145 ||  || — || January 16, 1999 || Socorro || LINEAR || — || align=right | 4.0 km || 
|-id=146 bgcolor=#E9E9E9
| 219146 ||  || — || March 19, 1999 || Socorro || LINEAR || — || align=right | 4.6 km || 
|-id=147 bgcolor=#E9E9E9
| 219147 ||  || — || April 16, 1999 || Kitt Peak || Spacewatch || AER || align=right | 1.9 km || 
|-id=148 bgcolor=#E9E9E9
| 219148 ||  || — || May 10, 1999 || Socorro || LINEAR || — || align=right | 2.4 km || 
|-id=149 bgcolor=#E9E9E9
| 219149 ||  || — || August 8, 1999 || Kitt Peak || Spacewatch || — || align=right | 3.9 km || 
|-id=150 bgcolor=#fefefe
| 219150 ||  || — || September 3, 1999 || Kitt Peak || Spacewatch || — || align=right | 1.4 km || 
|-id=151 bgcolor=#d6d6d6
| 219151 ||  || — || September 7, 1999 || Socorro || LINEAR || — || align=right | 3.6 km || 
|-id=152 bgcolor=#fefefe
| 219152 ||  || — || September 9, 1999 || Socorro || LINEAR || — || align=right | 1.2 km || 
|-id=153 bgcolor=#fefefe
| 219153 ||  || — || September 8, 1999 || Socorro || LINEAR || — || align=right | 1.1 km || 
|-id=154 bgcolor=#fefefe
| 219154 ||  || — || September 9, 1999 || Socorro || LINEAR || — || align=right | 1.3 km || 
|-id=155 bgcolor=#fefefe
| 219155 ||  || — || September 9, 1999 || Socorro || LINEAR || — || align=right data-sort-value="0.92" | 920 m || 
|-id=156 bgcolor=#fefefe
| 219156 ||  || — || September 9, 1999 || Socorro || LINEAR || FLO || align=right data-sort-value="0.98" | 980 m || 
|-id=157 bgcolor=#fefefe
| 219157 ||  || — || September 9, 1999 || Socorro || LINEAR || — || align=right data-sort-value="0.93" | 930 m || 
|-id=158 bgcolor=#d6d6d6
| 219158 ||  || — || September 8, 1999 || Socorro || LINEAR || EOS || align=right | 3.8 km || 
|-id=159 bgcolor=#fefefe
| 219159 ||  || — || September 4, 1999 || Catalina || CSS || — || align=right | 1.2 km || 
|-id=160 bgcolor=#fefefe
| 219160 ||  || — || September 7, 1999 || Socorro || LINEAR || — || align=right | 1.3 km || 
|-id=161 bgcolor=#d6d6d6
| 219161 ||  || — || September 5, 1999 || Catalina || CSS || — || align=right | 4.8 km || 
|-id=162 bgcolor=#fefefe
| 219162 ||  || — || September 8, 1999 || Catalina || CSS || — || align=right | 1.5 km || 
|-id=163 bgcolor=#fefefe
| 219163 ||  || — || September 30, 1999 || Socorro || LINEAR || FLO || align=right data-sort-value="0.91" | 910 m || 
|-id=164 bgcolor=#fefefe
| 219164 ||  || — || October 11, 1999 || Gnosca || S. Sposetti || FLO || align=right | 1.5 km || 
|-id=165 bgcolor=#d6d6d6
| 219165 ||  || — || October 1, 1999 || Catalina || CSS || — || align=right | 3.4 km || 
|-id=166 bgcolor=#d6d6d6
| 219166 ||  || — || October 3, 1999 || Kitt Peak || Spacewatch || KOR || align=right | 1.6 km || 
|-id=167 bgcolor=#fefefe
| 219167 ||  || — || October 6, 1999 || Kitt Peak || Spacewatch || — || align=right | 1.2 km || 
|-id=168 bgcolor=#fefefe
| 219168 ||  || — || October 6, 1999 || Kitt Peak || Spacewatch || — || align=right data-sort-value="0.88" | 880 m || 
|-id=169 bgcolor=#fefefe
| 219169 ||  || — || October 7, 1999 || Kitt Peak || Spacewatch || — || align=right data-sort-value="0.79" | 790 m || 
|-id=170 bgcolor=#d6d6d6
| 219170 ||  || — || October 9, 1999 || Kitt Peak || Spacewatch || — || align=right | 3.2 km || 
|-id=171 bgcolor=#d6d6d6
| 219171 ||  || — || October 10, 1999 || Kitt Peak || Spacewatch || KOR || align=right | 1.9 km || 
|-id=172 bgcolor=#fefefe
| 219172 ||  || — || October 11, 1999 || Kitt Peak || Spacewatch || — || align=right data-sort-value="0.89" | 890 m || 
|-id=173 bgcolor=#d6d6d6
| 219173 ||  || — || October 4, 1999 || Socorro || LINEAR || — || align=right | 4.6 km || 
|-id=174 bgcolor=#fefefe
| 219174 ||  || — || October 6, 1999 || Socorro || LINEAR || FLO || align=right data-sort-value="0.99" | 990 m || 
|-id=175 bgcolor=#fefefe
| 219175 ||  || — || October 7, 1999 || Socorro || LINEAR || FLO || align=right data-sort-value="0.91" | 910 m || 
|-id=176 bgcolor=#d6d6d6
| 219176 ||  || — || October 10, 1999 || Socorro || LINEAR || — || align=right | 4.1 km || 
|-id=177 bgcolor=#fefefe
| 219177 ||  || — || October 10, 1999 || Socorro || LINEAR || FLO || align=right data-sort-value="0.92" | 920 m || 
|-id=178 bgcolor=#d6d6d6
| 219178 ||  || — || October 10, 1999 || Socorro || LINEAR || EOS || align=right | 3.4 km || 
|-id=179 bgcolor=#fefefe
| 219179 ||  || — || October 11, 1999 || Socorro || LINEAR || — || align=right | 1.3 km || 
|-id=180 bgcolor=#d6d6d6
| 219180 ||  || — || October 12, 1999 || Socorro || LINEAR || — || align=right | 5.5 km || 
|-id=181 bgcolor=#fefefe
| 219181 ||  || — || October 12, 1999 || Socorro || LINEAR || — || align=right | 1.2 km || 
|-id=182 bgcolor=#d6d6d6
| 219182 ||  || — || October 13, 1999 || Socorro || LINEAR || — || align=right | 4.5 km || 
|-id=183 bgcolor=#fefefe
| 219183 ||  || — || October 14, 1999 || Socorro || LINEAR || PHO || align=right | 2.5 km || 
|-id=184 bgcolor=#d6d6d6
| 219184 ||  || — || October 14, 1999 || Socorro || LINEAR || — || align=right | 5.5 km || 
|-id=185 bgcolor=#d6d6d6
| 219185 ||  || — || October 15, 1999 || Socorro || LINEAR || 628 || align=right | 2.9 km || 
|-id=186 bgcolor=#fefefe
| 219186 ||  || — || October 15, 1999 || Socorro || LINEAR || FLO || align=right data-sort-value="0.81" | 810 m || 
|-id=187 bgcolor=#fefefe
| 219187 ||  || — || October 15, 1999 || Socorro || LINEAR || — || align=right data-sort-value="0.94" | 940 m || 
|-id=188 bgcolor=#fefefe
| 219188 ||  || — || October 12, 1999 || Socorro || LINEAR || — || align=right | 2.2 km || 
|-id=189 bgcolor=#fefefe
| 219189 ||  || — || October 10, 1999 || Socorro || LINEAR || — || align=right | 1.1 km || 
|-id=190 bgcolor=#fefefe
| 219190 ||  || — || October 3, 1999 || Kitt Peak || Spacewatch || — || align=right | 1.2 km || 
|-id=191 bgcolor=#d6d6d6
| 219191 ||  || — || October 10, 1999 || Kitt Peak || Spacewatch || — || align=right | 2.7 km || 
|-id=192 bgcolor=#fefefe
| 219192 ||  || — || October 30, 1999 || Socorro || LINEAR || H || align=right | 1.5 km || 
|-id=193 bgcolor=#fefefe
| 219193 ||  || — || October 31, 1999 || Socorro || LINEAR || PHO || align=right | 4.4 km || 
|-id=194 bgcolor=#d6d6d6
| 219194 ||  || — || October 30, 1999 || Kitt Peak || Spacewatch || — || align=right | 3.2 km || 
|-id=195 bgcolor=#fefefe
| 219195 ||  || — || October 31, 1999 || Kitt Peak || Spacewatch || — || align=right data-sort-value="0.95" | 950 m || 
|-id=196 bgcolor=#fefefe
| 219196 ||  || — || October 31, 1999 || Kitt Peak || Spacewatch || FLO || align=right data-sort-value="0.73" | 730 m || 
|-id=197 bgcolor=#d6d6d6
| 219197 ||  || — || October 16, 1999 || Socorro || LINEAR || — || align=right | 3.6 km || 
|-id=198 bgcolor=#d6d6d6
| 219198 ||  || — || October 29, 1999 || Catalina || CSS || — || align=right | 5.1 km || 
|-id=199 bgcolor=#fefefe
| 219199 ||  || — || October 31, 1999 || Catalina || CSS || FLO || align=right data-sort-value="0.83" | 830 m || 
|-id=200 bgcolor=#fefefe
| 219200 ||  || — || November 1, 1999 || Kitt Peak || Spacewatch || — || align=right data-sort-value="0.71" | 710 m || 
|}

219201–219300 

|-bgcolor=#d6d6d6
| 219201 ||  || — || November 5, 1999 || Oizumi || T. Kobayashi || — || align=right | 4.9 km || 
|-id=202 bgcolor=#fefefe
| 219202 ||  || — || November 7, 1999 || Gnosca || S. Sposetti || — || align=right | 1.0 km || 
|-id=203 bgcolor=#d6d6d6
| 219203 ||  || — || November 2, 1999 || Kitt Peak || Spacewatch || — || align=right | 3.0 km || 
|-id=204 bgcolor=#d6d6d6
| 219204 ||  || — || November 3, 1999 || Socorro || LINEAR || — || align=right | 8.5 km || 
|-id=205 bgcolor=#fefefe
| 219205 ||  || — || November 15, 1999 || Ondřejov || P. Pravec, P. Kušnirák || — || align=right | 1.4 km || 
|-id=206 bgcolor=#fefefe
| 219206 ||  || — || November 4, 1999 || Kitt Peak || Spacewatch || V || align=right data-sort-value="0.83" | 830 m || 
|-id=207 bgcolor=#d6d6d6
| 219207 ||  || — || November 3, 1999 || Socorro || LINEAR || EMA || align=right | 5.4 km || 
|-id=208 bgcolor=#fefefe
| 219208 ||  || — || November 3, 1999 || Socorro || LINEAR || — || align=right | 1.5 km || 
|-id=209 bgcolor=#d6d6d6
| 219209 ||  || — || November 4, 1999 || Socorro || LINEAR || EOS || align=right | 2.6 km || 
|-id=210 bgcolor=#d6d6d6
| 219210 ||  || — || November 4, 1999 || Socorro || LINEAR || EOS || align=right | 3.2 km || 
|-id=211 bgcolor=#d6d6d6
| 219211 ||  || — || November 5, 1999 || Kitt Peak || Spacewatch || — || align=right | 4.4 km || 
|-id=212 bgcolor=#fefefe
| 219212 ||  || — || November 5, 1999 || Kitt Peak || Spacewatch || — || align=right data-sort-value="0.90" | 900 m || 
|-id=213 bgcolor=#E9E9E9
| 219213 ||  || — || November 4, 1999 || Socorro || LINEAR || — || align=right | 3.6 km || 
|-id=214 bgcolor=#d6d6d6
| 219214 ||  || — || November 5, 1999 || Socorro || LINEAR || — || align=right | 3.8 km || 
|-id=215 bgcolor=#d6d6d6
| 219215 ||  || — || November 9, 1999 || Socorro || LINEAR || — || align=right | 3.3 km || 
|-id=216 bgcolor=#d6d6d6
| 219216 ||  || — || November 9, 1999 || Socorro || LINEAR || — || align=right | 4.9 km || 
|-id=217 bgcolor=#d6d6d6
| 219217 ||  || — || November 9, 1999 || Socorro || LINEAR || — || align=right | 4.8 km || 
|-id=218 bgcolor=#d6d6d6
| 219218 ||  || — || November 9, 1999 || Socorro || LINEAR || — || align=right | 3.6 km || 
|-id=219 bgcolor=#d6d6d6
| 219219 ||  || — || November 3, 1999 || Kitt Peak || Spacewatch || TEL || align=right | 1.8 km || 
|-id=220 bgcolor=#d6d6d6
| 219220 ||  || — || November 5, 1999 || Kitt Peak || Spacewatch || — || align=right | 3.4 km || 
|-id=221 bgcolor=#d6d6d6
| 219221 ||  || — || November 5, 1999 || Kitt Peak || Spacewatch || — || align=right | 3.0 km || 
|-id=222 bgcolor=#d6d6d6
| 219222 ||  || — || November 10, 1999 || Kitt Peak || Spacewatch || KOR || align=right | 2.0 km || 
|-id=223 bgcolor=#d6d6d6
| 219223 ||  || — || November 12, 1999 || Socorro || LINEAR || — || align=right | 3.3 km || 
|-id=224 bgcolor=#d6d6d6
| 219224 ||  || — || November 12, 1999 || Socorro || LINEAR || — || align=right | 4.3 km || 
|-id=225 bgcolor=#d6d6d6
| 219225 ||  || — || November 10, 1999 || Kitt Peak || Spacewatch || — || align=right | 3.4 km || 
|-id=226 bgcolor=#fefefe
| 219226 ||  || — || November 14, 1999 || Socorro || LINEAR || FLO || align=right data-sort-value="0.81" | 810 m || 
|-id=227 bgcolor=#fefefe
| 219227 ||  || — || November 14, 1999 || Socorro || LINEAR || — || align=right data-sort-value="0.90" | 900 m || 
|-id=228 bgcolor=#fefefe
| 219228 ||  || — || November 12, 1999 || Socorro || LINEAR || — || align=right | 1.0 km || 
|-id=229 bgcolor=#d6d6d6
| 219229 ||  || — || November 14, 1999 || Socorro || LINEAR || — || align=right | 3.7 km || 
|-id=230 bgcolor=#fefefe
| 219230 ||  || — || November 14, 1999 || Socorro || LINEAR || — || align=right | 1.3 km || 
|-id=231 bgcolor=#fefefe
| 219231 ||  || — || November 14, 1999 || Socorro || LINEAR || — || align=right | 1.3 km || 
|-id=232 bgcolor=#d6d6d6
| 219232 ||  || — || November 14, 1999 || Socorro || LINEAR || — || align=right | 5.7 km || 
|-id=233 bgcolor=#d6d6d6
| 219233 ||  || — || November 15, 1999 || Socorro || LINEAR || — || align=right | 4.5 km || 
|-id=234 bgcolor=#d6d6d6
| 219234 ||  || — || November 14, 1999 || Socorro || LINEAR || — || align=right | 3.6 km || 
|-id=235 bgcolor=#fefefe
| 219235 ||  || — || November 3, 1999 || Catalina || CSS || — || align=right | 1.0 km || 
|-id=236 bgcolor=#d6d6d6
| 219236 ||  || — || November 11, 1999 || Catalina || CSS || — || align=right | 4.9 km || 
|-id=237 bgcolor=#fefefe
| 219237 ||  || — || November 12, 1999 || Socorro || LINEAR || — || align=right | 1.5 km || 
|-id=238 bgcolor=#d6d6d6
| 219238 ||  || — || November 30, 1999 || Kitt Peak || Spacewatch || — || align=right | 4.3 km || 
|-id=239 bgcolor=#fefefe
| 219239 ||  || — || November 17, 1999 || Kitt Peak || Spacewatch || NYS || align=right data-sort-value="0.79" | 790 m || 
|-id=240 bgcolor=#d6d6d6
| 219240 || 1999 XN || — || December 2, 1999 || Kitt Peak || Spacewatch || — || align=right | 3.0 km || 
|-id=241 bgcolor=#d6d6d6
| 219241 ||  || — || December 6, 1999 || Socorro || LINEAR || — || align=right | 4.4 km || 
|-id=242 bgcolor=#fefefe
| 219242 ||  || — || December 7, 1999 || Socorro || LINEAR || — || align=right | 1.2 km || 
|-id=243 bgcolor=#fefefe
| 219243 ||  || — || December 7, 1999 || Socorro || LINEAR || V || align=right data-sort-value="0.96" | 960 m || 
|-id=244 bgcolor=#d6d6d6
| 219244 ||  || — || December 7, 1999 || Socorro || LINEAR || EOS || align=right | 3.4 km || 
|-id=245 bgcolor=#fefefe
| 219245 ||  || — || December 7, 1999 || Socorro || LINEAR || — || align=right data-sort-value="0.98" | 980 m || 
|-id=246 bgcolor=#fefefe
| 219246 ||  || — || December 7, 1999 || Socorro || LINEAR || — || align=right data-sort-value="0.95" | 950 m || 
|-id=247 bgcolor=#d6d6d6
| 219247 ||  || — || December 5, 1999 || Catalina || CSS || — || align=right | 5.5 km || 
|-id=248 bgcolor=#d6d6d6
| 219248 ||  || — || December 12, 1999 || Socorro || LINEAR || — || align=right | 4.7 km || 
|-id=249 bgcolor=#d6d6d6
| 219249 ||  || — || December 6, 1999 || Kitt Peak || Spacewatch || — || align=right | 6.0 km || 
|-id=250 bgcolor=#fefefe
| 219250 ||  || — || December 13, 1999 || Socorro || LINEAR || — || align=right data-sort-value="0.91" | 910 m || 
|-id=251 bgcolor=#fefefe
| 219251 ||  || — || December 13, 1999 || Socorro || LINEAR || — || align=right | 1.2 km || 
|-id=252 bgcolor=#fefefe
| 219252 ||  || — || December 12, 1999 || Socorro || LINEAR || — || align=right | 1.2 km || 
|-id=253 bgcolor=#FA8072
| 219253 ||  || — || December 5, 1999 || Catalina || CSS || — || align=right | 1.2 km || 
|-id=254 bgcolor=#d6d6d6
| 219254 ||  || — || December 7, 1999 || Kitt Peak || Spacewatch || EOS || align=right | 3.2 km || 
|-id=255 bgcolor=#E9E9E9
| 219255 ||  || — || December 27, 1999 || Kitt Peak || Spacewatch || — || align=right | 1.0 km || 
|-id=256 bgcolor=#d6d6d6
| 219256 ||  || — || January 3, 2000 || Kitt Peak || Spacewatch || — || align=right | 5.6 km || 
|-id=257 bgcolor=#d6d6d6
| 219257 ||  || — || January 3, 2000 || Socorro || LINEAR || — || align=right | 4.1 km || 
|-id=258 bgcolor=#fefefe
| 219258 ||  || — || January 4, 2000 || Socorro || LINEAR || H || align=right | 1.0 km || 
|-id=259 bgcolor=#d6d6d6
| 219259 ||  || — || January 2, 2000 || Kitt Peak || Spacewatch || — || align=right | 3.3 km || 
|-id=260 bgcolor=#fefefe
| 219260 ||  || — || January 5, 2000 || Socorro || LINEAR || NYS || align=right | 1.0 km || 
|-id=261 bgcolor=#fefefe
| 219261 ||  || — || January 4, 2000 || Socorro || LINEAR || NYS || align=right | 2.6 km || 
|-id=262 bgcolor=#d6d6d6
| 219262 ||  || — || January 5, 2000 || Socorro || LINEAR || — || align=right | 3.2 km || 
|-id=263 bgcolor=#d6d6d6
| 219263 ||  || — || January 4, 2000 || Socorro || LINEAR || EOS || align=right | 3.5 km || 
|-id=264 bgcolor=#d6d6d6
| 219264 ||  || — || January 3, 2000 || Socorro || LINEAR || — || align=right | 6.2 km || 
|-id=265 bgcolor=#d6d6d6
| 219265 ||  || — || January 3, 2000 || Socorro || LINEAR || — || align=right | 4.1 km || 
|-id=266 bgcolor=#fefefe
| 219266 ||  || — || January 5, 2000 || Socorro || LINEAR || — || align=right | 1.1 km || 
|-id=267 bgcolor=#d6d6d6
| 219267 ||  || — || January 7, 2000 || Socorro || LINEAR || — || align=right | 7.9 km || 
|-id=268 bgcolor=#d6d6d6
| 219268 ||  || — || January 8, 2000 || Socorro || LINEAR || — || align=right | 4.7 km || 
|-id=269 bgcolor=#d6d6d6
| 219269 ||  || — || January 9, 2000 || Socorro || LINEAR || — || align=right | 4.8 km || 
|-id=270 bgcolor=#fefefe
| 219270 ||  || — || January 3, 2000 || Kitt Peak || Spacewatch || NYS || align=right | 2.0 km || 
|-id=271 bgcolor=#d6d6d6
| 219271 ||  || — || January 5, 2000 || Kitt Peak || Spacewatch || — || align=right | 3.3 km || 
|-id=272 bgcolor=#d6d6d6
| 219272 ||  || — || January 5, 2000 || Socorro || LINEAR || — || align=right | 3.2 km || 
|-id=273 bgcolor=#fefefe
| 219273 ||  || — || January 8, 2000 || Socorro || LINEAR || — || align=right | 1.6 km || 
|-id=274 bgcolor=#d6d6d6
| 219274 ||  || — || January 28, 2000 || Rock Finder || W. K. Y. Yeung || — || align=right | 4.3 km || 
|-id=275 bgcolor=#FA8072
| 219275 ||  || — || January 26, 2000 || Kitt Peak || Spacewatch || — || align=right | 1.0 km || 
|-id=276 bgcolor=#fefefe
| 219276 ||  || — || January 30, 2000 || Socorro || LINEAR || NYS || align=right | 1.0 km || 
|-id=277 bgcolor=#fefefe
| 219277 ||  || — || January 27, 2000 || Kitt Peak || Spacewatch || — || align=right | 1.2 km || 
|-id=278 bgcolor=#fefefe
| 219278 ||  || — || February 2, 2000 || Socorro || LINEAR || — || align=right | 1.3 km || 
|-id=279 bgcolor=#fefefe
| 219279 ||  || — || February 6, 2000 || Socorro || LINEAR || H || align=right | 1.4 km || 
|-id=280 bgcolor=#fefefe
| 219280 ||  || — || February 1, 2000 || Kitt Peak || Spacewatch || MAS || align=right data-sort-value="0.94" | 940 m || 
|-id=281 bgcolor=#d6d6d6
| 219281 ||  || — || February 1, 2000 || Kitt Peak || Spacewatch || — || align=right | 3.7 km || 
|-id=282 bgcolor=#d6d6d6
| 219282 ||  || — || February 8, 2000 || Kitt Peak || Spacewatch || THM || align=right | 2.7 km || 
|-id=283 bgcolor=#fefefe
| 219283 ||  || — || February 6, 2000 || Socorro || LINEAR || — || align=right | 3.1 km || 
|-id=284 bgcolor=#fefefe
| 219284 ||  || — || February 11, 2000 || Kitt Peak || Spacewatch || — || align=right | 1.0 km || 
|-id=285 bgcolor=#d6d6d6
| 219285 ||  || — || February 12, 2000 || Kitt Peak || Spacewatch || THM || align=right | 2.6 km || 
|-id=286 bgcolor=#fefefe
| 219286 ||  || — || February 5, 2000 || Kitt Peak || M. W. Buie || V || align=right data-sort-value="0.89" | 890 m || 
|-id=287 bgcolor=#d6d6d6
| 219287 ||  || — || February 3, 2000 || Socorro || LINEAR || — || align=right | 4.1 km || 
|-id=288 bgcolor=#fefefe
| 219288 ||  || — || February 3, 2000 || Socorro || LINEAR || — || align=right | 1.7 km || 
|-id=289 bgcolor=#d6d6d6
| 219289 ||  || — || February 3, 2000 || Socorro || LINEAR || HYG || align=right | 3.9 km || 
|-id=290 bgcolor=#fefefe
| 219290 ||  || — || February 4, 2000 || Kitt Peak || Spacewatch || — || align=right | 1.1 km || 
|-id=291 bgcolor=#fefefe
| 219291 ||  || — || February 3, 2000 || Kitt Peak || Spacewatch || — || align=right data-sort-value="0.94" | 940 m || 
|-id=292 bgcolor=#fefefe
| 219292 || 2000 DT || — || February 24, 2000 || Oizumi || T. Kobayashi || PHO || align=right | 1.6 km || 
|-id=293 bgcolor=#fefefe
| 219293 ||  || — || February 29, 2000 || Socorro || LINEAR || MAS || align=right | 1.2 km || 
|-id=294 bgcolor=#d6d6d6
| 219294 ||  || — || February 29, 2000 || Socorro || LINEAR || HYG || align=right | 4.6 km || 
|-id=295 bgcolor=#fefefe
| 219295 ||  || — || February 29, 2000 || Socorro || LINEAR || — || align=right | 1.4 km || 
|-id=296 bgcolor=#fefefe
| 219296 ||  || — || February 29, 2000 || Socorro || LINEAR || MAS || align=right | 1.2 km || 
|-id=297 bgcolor=#d6d6d6
| 219297 ||  || — || February 29, 2000 || Socorro || LINEAR || THM || align=right | 3.1 km || 
|-id=298 bgcolor=#fefefe
| 219298 ||  || — || February 29, 2000 || Socorro || LINEAR || — || align=right | 1.3 km || 
|-id=299 bgcolor=#fefefe
| 219299 ||  || — || February 29, 2000 || Socorro || LINEAR || NYS || align=right data-sort-value="0.94" | 940 m || 
|-id=300 bgcolor=#fefefe
| 219300 ||  || — || February 29, 2000 || Socorro || LINEAR || NYS || align=right | 1.0 km || 
|}

219301–219400 

|-bgcolor=#fefefe
| 219301 ||  || — || February 29, 2000 || Socorro || LINEAR || NYS || align=right | 1.0 km || 
|-id=302 bgcolor=#fefefe
| 219302 ||  || — || February 28, 2000 || Socorro || LINEAR || — || align=right | 1.3 km || 
|-id=303 bgcolor=#d6d6d6
| 219303 ||  || — || February 29, 2000 || Socorro || LINEAR || EUP || align=right | 5.9 km || 
|-id=304 bgcolor=#fefefe
| 219304 ||  || — || February 28, 2000 || Socorro || LINEAR || — || align=right | 1.6 km || 
|-id=305 bgcolor=#fefefe
| 219305 ||  || — || February 29, 2000 || Socorro || LINEAR || — || align=right | 1.5 km || 
|-id=306 bgcolor=#fefefe
| 219306 ||  || — || February 29, 2000 || Socorro || LINEAR || — || align=right | 1.2 km || 
|-id=307 bgcolor=#fefefe
| 219307 ||  || — || February 29, 2000 || Socorro || LINEAR || — || align=right | 1.00 km || 
|-id=308 bgcolor=#d6d6d6
| 219308 ||  || — || March 3, 2000 || Socorro || LINEAR || — || align=right | 3.3 km || 
|-id=309 bgcolor=#fefefe
| 219309 ||  || — || March 3, 2000 || Socorro || LINEAR || MAS || align=right data-sort-value="0.93" | 930 m || 
|-id=310 bgcolor=#fefefe
| 219310 ||  || — || March 3, 2000 || Socorro || LINEAR || — || align=right | 1.4 km || 
|-id=311 bgcolor=#fefefe
| 219311 ||  || — || March 3, 2000 || Kitt Peak || Spacewatch || MAS || align=right data-sort-value="0.84" | 840 m || 
|-id=312 bgcolor=#fefefe
| 219312 ||  || — || March 10, 2000 || Socorro || LINEAR || — || align=right | 1.4 km || 
|-id=313 bgcolor=#d6d6d6
| 219313 ||  || — || March 9, 2000 || Kitt Peak || Spacewatch || — || align=right | 4.3 km || 
|-id=314 bgcolor=#fefefe
| 219314 ||  || — || March 10, 2000 || Kitt Peak || Spacewatch || NYS || align=right data-sort-value="0.79" | 790 m || 
|-id=315 bgcolor=#FA8072
| 219315 ||  || — || March 11, 2000 || Anderson Mesa || LONEOS || PHO || align=right | 4.5 km || 
|-id=316 bgcolor=#d6d6d6
| 219316 ||  || — || March 3, 2000 || Socorro || LINEAR || HYG || align=right | 4.8 km || 
|-id=317 bgcolor=#fefefe
| 219317 ||  || — || March 30, 2000 || Prescott || P. G. Comba || NYS || align=right data-sort-value="0.90" | 900 m || 
|-id=318 bgcolor=#fefefe
| 219318 ||  || — || March 29, 2000 || Kitt Peak || Spacewatch || MAS || align=right data-sort-value="0.84" | 840 m || 
|-id=319 bgcolor=#FA8072
| 219319 ||  || — || March 25, 2000 || Kitt Peak || Spacewatch || — || align=right data-sort-value="0.64" | 640 m || 
|-id=320 bgcolor=#fefefe
| 219320 ||  || — || March 27, 2000 || Anderson Mesa || LONEOS || NYS || align=right | 1.0 km || 
|-id=321 bgcolor=#fefefe
| 219321 ||  || — || March 27, 2000 || Anderson Mesa || LONEOS || NYS || align=right | 1.1 km || 
|-id=322 bgcolor=#fefefe
| 219322 ||  || — || March 30, 2000 || Kitt Peak || Spacewatch || MAS || align=right data-sort-value="0.92" | 920 m || 
|-id=323 bgcolor=#E9E9E9
| 219323 || 2000 GC || — || April 1, 2000 || Kitt Peak || Spacewatch || GER || align=right | 1.4 km || 
|-id=324 bgcolor=#E9E9E9
| 219324 ||  || — || April 6, 2000 || Anderson Mesa || LONEOS || — || align=right | 1.3 km || 
|-id=325 bgcolor=#fefefe
| 219325 ||  || — || April 27, 2000 || Socorro || LINEAR || — || align=right | 2.1 km || 
|-id=326 bgcolor=#fefefe
| 219326 ||  || — || April 28, 2000 || Kitt Peak || Spacewatch || — || align=right | 1.5 km || 
|-id=327 bgcolor=#E9E9E9
| 219327 ||  || — || April 28, 2000 || Anderson Mesa || LONEOS || — || align=right | 1.9 km || 
|-id=328 bgcolor=#fefefe
| 219328 ||  || — || May 6, 2000 || Socorro || LINEAR || NYS || align=right | 1.2 km || 
|-id=329 bgcolor=#E9E9E9
| 219329 ||  || — || May 7, 2000 || Socorro || LINEAR || — || align=right | 1.6 km || 
|-id=330 bgcolor=#FA8072
| 219330 ||  || — || May 26, 2000 || Socorro || LINEAR || — || align=right | 3.0 km || 
|-id=331 bgcolor=#fefefe
| 219331 ||  || — || May 26, 2000 || Kitt Peak || Spacewatch || NYS || align=right data-sort-value="0.97" | 970 m || 
|-id=332 bgcolor=#E9E9E9
| 219332 ||  || — || June 4, 2000 || Socorro || LINEAR || — || align=right | 2.9 km || 
|-id=333 bgcolor=#E9E9E9
| 219333 ||  || — || July 7, 2000 || Kitt Peak || Spacewatch || — || align=right | 2.6 km || 
|-id=334 bgcolor=#E9E9E9
| 219334 ||  || — || July 23, 2000 || Socorro || LINEAR || — || align=right | 4.6 km || 
|-id=335 bgcolor=#E9E9E9
| 219335 ||  || — || July 30, 2000 || Socorro || LINEAR || — || align=right | 2.9 km || 
|-id=336 bgcolor=#E9E9E9
| 219336 ||  || — || July 29, 2000 || Anderson Mesa || LONEOS || — || align=right | 2.7 km || 
|-id=337 bgcolor=#E9E9E9
| 219337 ||  || — || August 5, 2000 || Haleakala || NEAT || HNS || align=right | 2.4 km || 
|-id=338 bgcolor=#E9E9E9
| 219338 ||  || — || August 24, 2000 || Socorro || LINEAR || — || align=right | 2.6 km || 
|-id=339 bgcolor=#E9E9E9
| 219339 ||  || — || August 25, 2000 || Socorro || LINEAR || — || align=right | 3.2 km || 
|-id=340 bgcolor=#E9E9E9
| 219340 ||  || — || August 26, 2000 || Socorro || LINEAR || BRU || align=right | 4.2 km || 
|-id=341 bgcolor=#E9E9E9
| 219341 ||  || — || August 24, 2000 || Socorro || LINEAR || — || align=right | 3.4 km || 
|-id=342 bgcolor=#E9E9E9
| 219342 ||  || — || August 26, 2000 || Socorro || LINEAR || — || align=right | 2.6 km || 
|-id=343 bgcolor=#E9E9E9
| 219343 ||  || — || August 24, 2000 || Socorro || LINEAR || — || align=right | 3.0 km || 
|-id=344 bgcolor=#E9E9E9
| 219344 ||  || — || August 31, 2000 || Socorro || LINEAR || — || align=right | 3.7 km || 
|-id=345 bgcolor=#E9E9E9
| 219345 ||  || — || August 31, 2000 || Socorro || LINEAR || — || align=right | 3.6 km || 
|-id=346 bgcolor=#E9E9E9
| 219346 ||  || — || August 31, 2000 || Socorro || LINEAR || — || align=right | 3.7 km || 
|-id=347 bgcolor=#E9E9E9
| 219347 ||  || — || August 31, 2000 || Socorro || LINEAR || — || align=right | 2.9 km || 
|-id=348 bgcolor=#E9E9E9
| 219348 ||  || — || August 26, 2000 || Socorro || LINEAR || — || align=right | 4.5 km || 
|-id=349 bgcolor=#E9E9E9
| 219349 ||  || — || August 26, 2000 || Socorro || LINEAR || — || align=right | 1.8 km || 
|-id=350 bgcolor=#E9E9E9
| 219350 ||  || — || August 31, 2000 || Socorro || LINEAR || — || align=right | 2.6 km || 
|-id=351 bgcolor=#E9E9E9
| 219351 ||  || — || August 31, 2000 || Socorro || LINEAR || — || align=right | 3.6 km || 
|-id=352 bgcolor=#E9E9E9
| 219352 ||  || — || September 1, 2000 || Socorro || LINEAR || — || align=right | 4.7 km || 
|-id=353 bgcolor=#E9E9E9
| 219353 ||  || — || September 1, 2000 || Socorro || LINEAR || — || align=right | 3.9 km || 
|-id=354 bgcolor=#E9E9E9
| 219354 ||  || — || September 1, 2000 || Socorro || LINEAR || — || align=right | 3.8 km || 
|-id=355 bgcolor=#E9E9E9
| 219355 ||  || — || September 3, 2000 || Socorro || LINEAR || — || align=right | 4.1 km || 
|-id=356 bgcolor=#E9E9E9
| 219356 ||  || — || September 3, 2000 || Socorro || LINEAR || — || align=right | 3.9 km || 
|-id=357 bgcolor=#E9E9E9
| 219357 ||  || — || September 5, 2000 || Socorro || LINEAR || — || align=right | 3.9 km || 
|-id=358 bgcolor=#FA8072
| 219358 ||  || — || September 9, 2000 || Anderson Mesa || LONEOS || — || align=right | 2.4 km || 
|-id=359 bgcolor=#E9E9E9
| 219359 ||  || — || September 1, 2000 || Socorro || LINEAR || — || align=right | 2.2 km || 
|-id=360 bgcolor=#E9E9E9
| 219360 ||  || — || September 1, 2000 || Socorro || LINEAR || — || align=right | 4.0 km || 
|-id=361 bgcolor=#E9E9E9
| 219361 ||  || — || September 3, 2000 || Socorro || LINEAR || — || align=right | 2.6 km || 
|-id=362 bgcolor=#E9E9E9
| 219362 ||  || — || September 4, 2000 || Kitt Peak || Spacewatch || — || align=right | 3.1 km || 
|-id=363 bgcolor=#E9E9E9
| 219363 ||  || — || September 5, 2000 || Anderson Mesa || LONEOS || ADE || align=right | 3.0 km || 
|-id=364 bgcolor=#E9E9E9
| 219364 ||  || — || September 20, 2000 || Socorro || LINEAR || RAF || align=right | 1.6 km || 
|-id=365 bgcolor=#E9E9E9
| 219365 ||  || — || September 24, 2000 || Drebach || J. Kandler || — || align=right | 3.5 km || 
|-id=366 bgcolor=#E9E9E9
| 219366 ||  || — || September 20, 2000 || Socorro || LINEAR || POS || align=right | 3.3 km || 
|-id=367 bgcolor=#E9E9E9
| 219367 ||  || — || September 23, 2000 || Socorro || LINEAR || — || align=right | 3.2 km || 
|-id=368 bgcolor=#E9E9E9
| 219368 ||  || — || September 23, 2000 || Socorro || LINEAR || — || align=right | 4.3 km || 
|-id=369 bgcolor=#E9E9E9
| 219369 ||  || — || September 24, 2000 || Socorro || LINEAR || — || align=right | 2.1 km || 
|-id=370 bgcolor=#E9E9E9
| 219370 ||  || — || September 24, 2000 || Socorro || LINEAR || — || align=right | 4.1 km || 
|-id=371 bgcolor=#E9E9E9
| 219371 ||  || — || September 24, 2000 || Socorro || LINEAR || — || align=right | 4.0 km || 
|-id=372 bgcolor=#E9E9E9
| 219372 ||  || — || September 24, 2000 || Socorro || LINEAR || GEF || align=right | 1.9 km || 
|-id=373 bgcolor=#E9E9E9
| 219373 ||  || — || September 22, 2000 || Socorro || LINEAR || JUN || align=right | 2.3 km || 
|-id=374 bgcolor=#E9E9E9
| 219374 ||  || — || September 23, 2000 || Socorro || LINEAR || — || align=right | 2.0 km || 
|-id=375 bgcolor=#E9E9E9
| 219375 ||  || — || September 23, 2000 || Socorro || LINEAR || — || align=right | 3.3 km || 
|-id=376 bgcolor=#E9E9E9
| 219376 ||  || — || September 23, 2000 || Socorro || LINEAR || — || align=right | 3.7 km || 
|-id=377 bgcolor=#E9E9E9
| 219377 ||  || — || September 24, 2000 || Socorro || LINEAR || — || align=right | 2.9 km || 
|-id=378 bgcolor=#E9E9E9
| 219378 ||  || — || September 24, 2000 || Socorro || LINEAR || — || align=right | 3.7 km || 
|-id=379 bgcolor=#E9E9E9
| 219379 ||  || — || September 24, 2000 || Socorro || LINEAR || — || align=right | 2.5 km || 
|-id=380 bgcolor=#E9E9E9
| 219380 ||  || — || September 24, 2000 || Socorro || LINEAR || — || align=right | 3.7 km || 
|-id=381 bgcolor=#E9E9E9
| 219381 ||  || — || September 24, 2000 || Socorro || LINEAR || — || align=right | 3.6 km || 
|-id=382 bgcolor=#E9E9E9
| 219382 ||  || — || September 29, 2000 || Emerald Lane || L. Ball || — || align=right | 2.9 km || 
|-id=383 bgcolor=#E9E9E9
| 219383 ||  || — || September 23, 2000 || Socorro || LINEAR || — || align=right | 3.7 km || 
|-id=384 bgcolor=#E9E9E9
| 219384 ||  || — || September 23, 2000 || Socorro || LINEAR || — || align=right | 3.7 km || 
|-id=385 bgcolor=#E9E9E9
| 219385 ||  || — || September 24, 2000 || Socorro || LINEAR || — || align=right | 3.5 km || 
|-id=386 bgcolor=#E9E9E9
| 219386 ||  || — || September 24, 2000 || Socorro || LINEAR || — || align=right | 4.4 km || 
|-id=387 bgcolor=#E9E9E9
| 219387 ||  || — || September 22, 2000 || Socorro || LINEAR || JUN || align=right | 1.6 km || 
|-id=388 bgcolor=#E9E9E9
| 219388 ||  || — || September 23, 2000 || Socorro || LINEAR || GEF || align=right | 2.1 km || 
|-id=389 bgcolor=#E9E9E9
| 219389 ||  || — || September 23, 2000 || Socorro || LINEAR || — || align=right | 3.4 km || 
|-id=390 bgcolor=#E9E9E9
| 219390 ||  || — || September 23, 2000 || Socorro || LINEAR || — || align=right | 1.8 km || 
|-id=391 bgcolor=#E9E9E9
| 219391 ||  || — || September 24, 2000 || Socorro || LINEAR || — || align=right | 3.1 km || 
|-id=392 bgcolor=#E9E9E9
| 219392 ||  || — || September 24, 2000 || Socorro || LINEAR || — || align=right | 2.3 km || 
|-id=393 bgcolor=#E9E9E9
| 219393 ||  || — || September 24, 2000 || Socorro || LINEAR || GEF || align=right | 2.3 km || 
|-id=394 bgcolor=#E9E9E9
| 219394 ||  || — || September 23, 2000 || Socorro || LINEAR || — || align=right | 4.1 km || 
|-id=395 bgcolor=#E9E9E9
| 219395 ||  || — || September 23, 2000 || Socorro || LINEAR || — || align=right | 4.0 km || 
|-id=396 bgcolor=#E9E9E9
| 219396 ||  || — || September 28, 2000 || Socorro || LINEAR || — || align=right | 3.6 km || 
|-id=397 bgcolor=#E9E9E9
| 219397 ||  || — || September 28, 2000 || Socorro || LINEAR || — || align=right | 4.1 km || 
|-id=398 bgcolor=#E9E9E9
| 219398 ||  || — || September 28, 2000 || Socorro || LINEAR || — || align=right | 2.6 km || 
|-id=399 bgcolor=#E9E9E9
| 219399 ||  || — || September 20, 2000 || Haleakala || NEAT || — || align=right | 2.9 km || 
|-id=400 bgcolor=#E9E9E9
| 219400 ||  || — || September 24, 2000 || Kitt Peak || Spacewatch || GEF || align=right | 1.9 km || 
|}

219401–219500 

|-bgcolor=#E9E9E9
| 219401 ||  || — || September 24, 2000 || Socorro || LINEAR || — || align=right | 2.8 km || 
|-id=402 bgcolor=#E9E9E9
| 219402 ||  || — || September 24, 2000 || Socorro || LINEAR || — || align=right | 2.3 km || 
|-id=403 bgcolor=#E9E9E9
| 219403 ||  || — || September 25, 2000 || Socorro || LINEAR || — || align=right | 2.8 km || 
|-id=404 bgcolor=#E9E9E9
| 219404 ||  || — || September 25, 2000 || Socorro || LINEAR || — || align=right | 3.7 km || 
|-id=405 bgcolor=#E9E9E9
| 219405 ||  || — || September 26, 2000 || Socorro || LINEAR || — || align=right | 3.7 km || 
|-id=406 bgcolor=#E9E9E9
| 219406 ||  || — || September 26, 2000 || Socorro || LINEAR || — || align=right | 3.0 km || 
|-id=407 bgcolor=#E9E9E9
| 219407 ||  || — || September 28, 2000 || Socorro || LINEAR || — || align=right | 4.0 km || 
|-id=408 bgcolor=#E9E9E9
| 219408 ||  || — || September 24, 2000 || Socorro || LINEAR || — || align=right | 4.4 km || 
|-id=409 bgcolor=#E9E9E9
| 219409 ||  || — || September 24, 2000 || Socorro || LINEAR || — || align=right | 3.9 km || 
|-id=410 bgcolor=#E9E9E9
| 219410 ||  || — || September 24, 2000 || Socorro || LINEAR || DOR || align=right | 4.5 km || 
|-id=411 bgcolor=#E9E9E9
| 219411 ||  || — || September 24, 2000 || Socorro || LINEAR || — || align=right | 3.7 km || 
|-id=412 bgcolor=#E9E9E9
| 219412 ||  || — || September 24, 2000 || Socorro || LINEAR || — || align=right | 3.4 km || 
|-id=413 bgcolor=#E9E9E9
| 219413 ||  || — || September 28, 2000 || Socorro || LINEAR || EUN || align=right | 1.9 km || 
|-id=414 bgcolor=#E9E9E9
| 219414 ||  || — || September 30, 2000 || Socorro || LINEAR || — || align=right | 2.2 km || 
|-id=415 bgcolor=#E9E9E9
| 219415 ||  || — || September 28, 2000 || Socorro || LINEAR || — || align=right | 4.1 km || 
|-id=416 bgcolor=#E9E9E9
| 219416 ||  || — || September 30, 2000 || Socorro || LINEAR || — || align=right | 3.0 km || 
|-id=417 bgcolor=#E9E9E9
| 219417 ||  || — || September 30, 2000 || Socorro || LINEAR || — || align=right | 4.9 km || 
|-id=418 bgcolor=#E9E9E9
| 219418 ||  || — || September 28, 2000 || Socorro || LINEAR || — || align=right | 3.5 km || 
|-id=419 bgcolor=#E9E9E9
| 219419 ||  || — || September 28, 2000 || Socorro || LINEAR || — || align=right | 3.9 km || 
|-id=420 bgcolor=#E9E9E9
| 219420 ||  || — || September 26, 2000 || Socorro || LINEAR || — || align=right | 3.9 km || 
|-id=421 bgcolor=#E9E9E9
| 219421 ||  || — || September 29, 2000 || Haleakala || NEAT || — || align=right | 2.6 km || 
|-id=422 bgcolor=#E9E9E9
| 219422 ||  || — || September 26, 2000 || Haleakala || NEAT || — || align=right | 2.4 km || 
|-id=423 bgcolor=#E9E9E9
| 219423 ||  || — || September 28, 2000 || Anderson Mesa || LONEOS || — || align=right | 3.1 km || 
|-id=424 bgcolor=#E9E9E9
| 219424 ||  || — || September 29, 2000 || Anderson Mesa || LONEOS || — || align=right | 3.7 km || 
|-id=425 bgcolor=#E9E9E9
| 219425 ||  || — || September 24, 2000 || Socorro || LINEAR || — || align=right | 2.9 km || 
|-id=426 bgcolor=#E9E9E9
| 219426 ||  || — || September 22, 2000 || Anderson Mesa || LONEOS || INO || align=right | 1.9 km || 
|-id=427 bgcolor=#E9E9E9
| 219427 ||  || — || September 24, 2000 || Anderson Mesa || LONEOS || DOR || align=right | 4.1 km || 
|-id=428 bgcolor=#E9E9E9
| 219428 ||  || — || October 1, 2000 || Socorro || LINEAR || — || align=right | 2.6 km || 
|-id=429 bgcolor=#E9E9E9
| 219429 ||  || — || October 3, 2000 || Socorro || LINEAR || — || align=right | 3.5 km || 
|-id=430 bgcolor=#E9E9E9
| 219430 ||  || — || October 1, 2000 || Socorro || LINEAR || — || align=right | 3.4 km || 
|-id=431 bgcolor=#E9E9E9
| 219431 ||  || — || October 2, 2000 || Anderson Mesa || LONEOS || — || align=right | 4.3 km || 
|-id=432 bgcolor=#E9E9E9
| 219432 ||  || — || October 1, 2000 || Socorro || LINEAR || — || align=right | 2.7 km || 
|-id=433 bgcolor=#E9E9E9
| 219433 ||  || — || October 24, 2000 || Socorro || LINEAR || GEF || align=right | 1.9 km || 
|-id=434 bgcolor=#E9E9E9
| 219434 ||  || — || October 24, 2000 || Socorro || LINEAR || MRX || align=right | 2.0 km || 
|-id=435 bgcolor=#E9E9E9
| 219435 ||  || — || October 24, 2000 || Socorro || LINEAR || DOR || align=right | 3.8 km || 
|-id=436 bgcolor=#E9E9E9
| 219436 ||  || — || October 24, 2000 || Socorro || LINEAR || HNA || align=right | 3.5 km || 
|-id=437 bgcolor=#E9E9E9
| 219437 ||  || — || October 25, 2000 || Socorro || LINEAR || — || align=right | 3.6 km || 
|-id=438 bgcolor=#E9E9E9
| 219438 ||  || — || October 25, 2000 || Socorro || LINEAR || — || align=right | 3.0 km || 
|-id=439 bgcolor=#E9E9E9
| 219439 ||  || — || October 25, 2000 || Socorro || LINEAR || HOF || align=right | 4.0 km || 
|-id=440 bgcolor=#E9E9E9
| 219440 ||  || — || October 25, 2000 || Socorro || LINEAR || — || align=right | 2.6 km || 
|-id=441 bgcolor=#E9E9E9
| 219441 ||  || — || October 24, 2000 || Socorro || LINEAR || — || align=right | 4.0 km || 
|-id=442 bgcolor=#E9E9E9
| 219442 ||  || — || October 25, 2000 || Socorro || LINEAR || — || align=right | 3.9 km || 
|-id=443 bgcolor=#E9E9E9
| 219443 ||  || — || October 25, 2000 || Socorro || LINEAR || — || align=right | 4.1 km || 
|-id=444 bgcolor=#E9E9E9
| 219444 ||  || — || October 27, 2000 || Socorro || LINEAR || — || align=right | 2.8 km || 
|-id=445 bgcolor=#E9E9E9
| 219445 ||  || — || November 1, 2000 || Socorro || LINEAR || — || align=right | 3.3 km || 
|-id=446 bgcolor=#E9E9E9
| 219446 ||  || — || November 1, 2000 || Socorro || LINEAR || — || align=right | 4.6 km || 
|-id=447 bgcolor=#E9E9E9
| 219447 ||  || — || November 1, 2000 || Socorro || LINEAR || — || align=right | 4.0 km || 
|-id=448 bgcolor=#E9E9E9
| 219448 || 2000 WN || — || November 16, 2000 || Socorro || LINEAR || DOR || align=right | 4.7 km || 
|-id=449 bgcolor=#E9E9E9
| 219449 ||  || — || November 21, 2000 || Socorro || LINEAR || — || align=right | 3.5 km || 
|-id=450 bgcolor=#d6d6d6
| 219450 ||  || — || November 21, 2000 || Socorro || LINEAR || BRA || align=right | 1.9 km || 
|-id=451 bgcolor=#E9E9E9
| 219451 ||  || — || November 27, 2000 || Kitt Peak || Spacewatch || — || align=right | 4.7 km || 
|-id=452 bgcolor=#E9E9E9
| 219452 ||  || — || November 20, 2000 || Socorro || LINEAR || — || align=right | 2.3 km || 
|-id=453 bgcolor=#E9E9E9
| 219453 ||  || — || November 19, 2000 || Socorro || LINEAR || — || align=right | 3.7 km || 
|-id=454 bgcolor=#d6d6d6
| 219454 ||  || — || November 29, 2000 || Socorro || LINEAR || YAK || align=right | 5.0 km || 
|-id=455 bgcolor=#E9E9E9
| 219455 ||  || — || November 30, 2000 || Socorro || LINEAR || GAL || align=right | 3.3 km || 
|-id=456 bgcolor=#E9E9E9
| 219456 ||  || — || November 23, 2000 || Kitt Peak || Spacewatch || — || align=right | 3.4 km || 
|-id=457 bgcolor=#E9E9E9
| 219457 ||  || — || November 24, 2000 || Anderson Mesa || LONEOS || MAR || align=right | 2.0 km || 
|-id=458 bgcolor=#E9E9E9
| 219458 ||  || — || December 1, 2000 || Socorro || LINEAR || — || align=right | 2.8 km || 
|-id=459 bgcolor=#E9E9E9
| 219459 ||  || — || December 4, 2000 || Socorro || LINEAR || — || align=right | 3.6 km || 
|-id=460 bgcolor=#E9E9E9
| 219460 ||  || — || December 5, 2000 || Socorro || LINEAR || — || align=right | 3.2 km || 
|-id=461 bgcolor=#d6d6d6
| 219461 ||  || — || December 5, 2000 || Socorro || LINEAR || — || align=right | 4.4 km || 
|-id=462 bgcolor=#E9E9E9
| 219462 ||  || — || December 17, 2000 || Socorro || LINEAR || — || align=right | 4.2 km || 
|-id=463 bgcolor=#d6d6d6
| 219463 ||  || — || December 28, 2000 || Kitt Peak || Spacewatch || KOR || align=right | 2.6 km || 
|-id=464 bgcolor=#E9E9E9
| 219464 ||  || — || December 30, 2000 || Socorro || LINEAR || — || align=right | 1.5 km || 
|-id=465 bgcolor=#fefefe
| 219465 ||  || — || December 30, 2000 || Socorro || LINEAR || — || align=right | 1.1 km || 
|-id=466 bgcolor=#C2FFFF
| 219466 ||  || — || January 2, 2001 || Socorro || LINEAR || L4 || align=right | 16 km || 
|-id=467 bgcolor=#E9E9E9
| 219467 ||  || — || January 5, 2001 || Socorro || LINEAR || DOR || align=right | 4.7 km || 
|-id=468 bgcolor=#d6d6d6
| 219468 ||  || — || January 1, 2001 || Kitt Peak || Spacewatch || — || align=right | 4.3 km || 
|-id=469 bgcolor=#d6d6d6
| 219469 ||  || — || January 20, 2001 || Socorro || LINEAR || BRA || align=right | 2.6 km || 
|-id=470 bgcolor=#d6d6d6
| 219470 ||  || — || January 20, 2001 || Socorro || LINEAR || — || align=right | 4.1 km || 
|-id=471 bgcolor=#d6d6d6
| 219471 ||  || — || January 26, 2001 || Socorro || LINEAR || — || align=right | 5.4 km || 
|-id=472 bgcolor=#d6d6d6
| 219472 || 2001 CC || — || February 1, 2001 || Kitt Peak || Spacewatch || URS || align=right | 4.9 km || 
|-id=473 bgcolor=#fefefe
| 219473 ||  || — || February 1, 2001 || Socorro || LINEAR || — || align=right | 1.5 km || 
|-id=474 bgcolor=#d6d6d6
| 219474 ||  || — || February 1, 2001 || Anderson Mesa || LONEOS || — || align=right | 3.7 km || 
|-id=475 bgcolor=#d6d6d6
| 219475 ||  || — || February 1, 2001 || Kitt Peak || Spacewatch || — || align=right | 5.3 km || 
|-id=476 bgcolor=#d6d6d6
| 219476 ||  || — || February 15, 2001 || Oizumi || T. Kobayashi || — || align=right | 5.1 km || 
|-id=477 bgcolor=#d6d6d6
| 219477 ||  || — || February 15, 2001 || Socorro || LINEAR || — || align=right | 5.3 km || 
|-id=478 bgcolor=#d6d6d6
| 219478 ||  || — || February 12, 2001 || Anderson Mesa || LONEOS || TIR || align=right | 4.9 km || 
|-id=479 bgcolor=#d6d6d6
| 219479 ||  || — || February 17, 2001 || Eskridge || Farpoint Obs. || — || align=right | 4.9 km || 
|-id=480 bgcolor=#d6d6d6
| 219480 ||  || — || February 16, 2001 || Oaxaca || J. M. Roe || — || align=right | 4.4 km || 
|-id=481 bgcolor=#FA8072
| 219481 ||  || — || February 20, 2001 || Haleakala || NEAT || — || align=right | 2.1 km || 
|-id=482 bgcolor=#fefefe
| 219482 ||  || — || February 17, 2001 || Socorro || LINEAR || — || align=right | 1.3 km || 
|-id=483 bgcolor=#d6d6d6
| 219483 ||  || — || February 19, 2001 || Socorro || LINEAR || — || align=right | 6.2 km || 
|-id=484 bgcolor=#d6d6d6
| 219484 ||  || — || February 19, 2001 || Socorro || LINEAR || — || align=right | 4.2 km || 
|-id=485 bgcolor=#d6d6d6
| 219485 ||  || — || February 22, 2001 || Kitt Peak || Spacewatch || — || align=right | 3.8 km || 
|-id=486 bgcolor=#fefefe
| 219486 ||  || — || February 19, 2001 || Socorro || LINEAR || — || align=right | 1.0 km || 
|-id=487 bgcolor=#d6d6d6
| 219487 ||  || — || February 20, 2001 || Kitt Peak || Spacewatch || EOS || align=right | 3.1 km || 
|-id=488 bgcolor=#fefefe
| 219488 ||  || — || March 3, 2001 || Socorro || LINEAR || — || align=right | 1.1 km || 
|-id=489 bgcolor=#d6d6d6
| 219489 ||  || — || March 2, 2001 || Anderson Mesa || LONEOS || — || align=right | 4.7 km || 
|-id=490 bgcolor=#d6d6d6
| 219490 ||  || — || March 2, 2001 || Anderson Mesa || LONEOS || — || align=right | 4.5 km || 
|-id=491 bgcolor=#fefefe
| 219491 ||  || — || March 18, 2001 || Prescott || P. G. Comba || — || align=right | 1.0 km || 
|-id=492 bgcolor=#fefefe
| 219492 ||  || — || March 18, 2001 || Socorro || LINEAR || — || align=right | 1.5 km || 
|-id=493 bgcolor=#d6d6d6
| 219493 ||  || — || March 18, 2001 || Socorro || LINEAR || — || align=right | 5.1 km || 
|-id=494 bgcolor=#fefefe
| 219494 ||  || — || March 19, 2001 || Socorro || LINEAR || — || align=right | 1.6 km || 
|-id=495 bgcolor=#d6d6d6
| 219495 ||  || — || March 19, 2001 || Socorro || LINEAR || HYG || align=right | 4.4 km || 
|-id=496 bgcolor=#fefefe
| 219496 ||  || — || March 21, 2001 || Anderson Mesa || LONEOS || FLO || align=right | 1.1 km || 
|-id=497 bgcolor=#fefefe
| 219497 ||  || — || March 21, 2001 || Anderson Mesa || LONEOS || — || align=right | 3.1 km || 
|-id=498 bgcolor=#d6d6d6
| 219498 ||  || — || March 18, 2001 || Anderson Mesa || LONEOS || — || align=right | 4.5 km || 
|-id=499 bgcolor=#d6d6d6
| 219499 ||  || — || March 18, 2001 || Socorro || LINEAR || — || align=right | 5.5 km || 
|-id=500 bgcolor=#d6d6d6
| 219500 ||  || — || March 27, 2001 || Anderson Mesa || LONEOS || — || align=right | 5.1 km || 
|}

219501–219600 

|-bgcolor=#fefefe
| 219501 ||  || — || March 26, 2001 || Haleakala || NEAT || FLO || align=right data-sort-value="0.85" | 850 m || 
|-id=502 bgcolor=#d6d6d6
| 219502 ||  || — || March 27, 2001 || Haleakala || NEAT || — || align=right | 5.3 km || 
|-id=503 bgcolor=#d6d6d6
| 219503 ||  || — || March 18, 2001 || Haleakala || NEAT || HYG || align=right | 4.8 km || 
|-id=504 bgcolor=#fefefe
| 219504 ||  || — || March 26, 2001 || Socorro || LINEAR || — || align=right data-sort-value="0.95" | 950 m || 
|-id=505 bgcolor=#fefefe
| 219505 ||  || — || April 16, 2001 || Socorro || LINEAR || ERI || align=right | 2.5 km || 
|-id=506 bgcolor=#fefefe
| 219506 ||  || — || April 18, 2001 || Haleakala || NEAT || — || align=right | 1.4 km || 
|-id=507 bgcolor=#fefefe
| 219507 ||  || — || April 27, 2001 || Haleakala || NEAT || ERI || align=right | 2.8 km || 
|-id=508 bgcolor=#d6d6d6
| 219508 ||  || — || May 17, 2001 || Socorro || LINEAR || — || align=right | 6.6 km || 
|-id=509 bgcolor=#fefefe
| 219509 ||  || — || May 18, 2001 || Socorro || LINEAR || ERI || align=right | 2.1 km || 
|-id=510 bgcolor=#fefefe
| 219510 ||  || — || June 27, 2001 || Palomar || NEAT || — || align=right | 1.6 km || 
|-id=511 bgcolor=#fefefe
| 219511 ||  || — || June 25, 2001 || Palomar || NEAT || NYS || align=right | 1.1 km || 
|-id=512 bgcolor=#fefefe
| 219512 ||  || — || July 13, 2001 || Palomar || NEAT || — || align=right | 1.1 km || 
|-id=513 bgcolor=#fefefe
| 219513 ||  || — || July 19, 2001 || Palomar || NEAT || — || align=right | 1.2 km || 
|-id=514 bgcolor=#fefefe
| 219514 ||  || — || July 22, 2001 || Palomar || NEAT || NYS || align=right | 1.9 km || 
|-id=515 bgcolor=#d6d6d6
| 219515 ||  || — || July 20, 2001 || Palomar || NEAT || — || align=right | 6.1 km || 
|-id=516 bgcolor=#fefefe
| 219516 ||  || — || July 21, 2001 || Palomar || NEAT || — || align=right | 1.5 km || 
|-id=517 bgcolor=#E9E9E9
| 219517 ||  || — || July 21, 2001 || Haleakala || NEAT || — || align=right | 2.6 km || 
|-id=518 bgcolor=#E9E9E9
| 219518 ||  || — || August 10, 2001 || Palomar || NEAT || — || align=right | 1.9 km || 
|-id=519 bgcolor=#fefefe
| 219519 ||  || — || August 16, 2001 || Socorro || LINEAR || — || align=right | 1.2 km || 
|-id=520 bgcolor=#fefefe
| 219520 ||  || — || August 16, 2001 || Socorro || LINEAR || — || align=right | 1.7 km || 
|-id=521 bgcolor=#fefefe
| 219521 ||  || — || August 16, 2001 || Socorro || LINEAR || — || align=right | 1.3 km || 
|-id=522 bgcolor=#FA8072
| 219522 ||  || — || August 17, 2001 || Socorro || LINEAR || — || align=right | 1.6 km || 
|-id=523 bgcolor=#E9E9E9
| 219523 ||  || — || August 18, 2001 || Socorro || LINEAR || — || align=right | 2.7 km || 
|-id=524 bgcolor=#E9E9E9
| 219524 ||  || — || August 22, 2001 || Socorro || LINEAR || — || align=right | 1.4 km || 
|-id=525 bgcolor=#E9E9E9
| 219525 ||  || — || August 17, 2001 || Socorro || LINEAR || — || align=right | 1.7 km || 
|-id=526 bgcolor=#E9E9E9
| 219526 ||  || — || August 17, 2001 || Socorro || LINEAR || — || align=right | 1.8 km || 
|-id=527 bgcolor=#FFC2E0
| 219527 ||  || — || August 23, 2001 || Anderson Mesa || LONEOS || AMO +1km || align=right | 1.6 km || 
|-id=528 bgcolor=#fefefe
| 219528 ||  || — || August 22, 2001 || Haleakala || NEAT || H || align=right data-sort-value="0.91" | 910 m || 
|-id=529 bgcolor=#E9E9E9
| 219529 ||  || — || August 26, 2001 || Palomar || NEAT || — || align=right | 1.5 km || 
|-id=530 bgcolor=#E9E9E9
| 219530 ||  || — || August 24, 2001 || Socorro || LINEAR || — || align=right | 2.2 km || 
|-id=531 bgcolor=#fefefe
| 219531 ||  || — || August 25, 2001 || Socorro || LINEAR || — || align=right | 1.0 km || 
|-id=532 bgcolor=#E9E9E9
| 219532 ||  || — || August 26, 2001 || Kitt Peak || Spacewatch || — || align=right | 1.2 km || 
|-id=533 bgcolor=#E9E9E9
| 219533 ||  || — || August 21, 2001 || Socorro || LINEAR || — || align=right | 2.1 km || 
|-id=534 bgcolor=#fefefe
| 219534 ||  || — || August 21, 2001 || Haleakala || NEAT || — || align=right | 4.2 km || 
|-id=535 bgcolor=#fefefe
| 219535 ||  || — || August 22, 2001 || Palomar || NEAT || H || align=right data-sort-value="0.98" | 980 m || 
|-id=536 bgcolor=#E9E9E9
| 219536 ||  || — || August 22, 2001 || Socorro || LINEAR || — || align=right | 1.7 km || 
|-id=537 bgcolor=#fefefe
| 219537 ||  || — || August 22, 2001 || Kitt Peak || Spacewatch || — || align=right | 1.8 km || 
|-id=538 bgcolor=#E9E9E9
| 219538 ||  || — || August 24, 2001 || Anderson Mesa || LONEOS || — || align=right | 1.7 km || 
|-id=539 bgcolor=#fefefe
| 219539 ||  || — || August 24, 2001 || Socorro || LINEAR || H || align=right data-sort-value="0.79" | 790 m || 
|-id=540 bgcolor=#E9E9E9
| 219540 ||  || — || August 24, 2001 || Socorro || LINEAR || — || align=right | 1.6 km || 
|-id=541 bgcolor=#fefefe
| 219541 ||  || — || August 24, 2001 || Haleakala || NEAT || — || align=right | 3.8 km || 
|-id=542 bgcolor=#fefefe
| 219542 ||  || — || August 20, 2001 || Palomar || NEAT || H || align=right data-sort-value="0.88" | 880 m || 
|-id=543 bgcolor=#E9E9E9
| 219543 ||  || — || August 16, 2001 || Palomar || NEAT || slow || align=right | 1.8 km || 
|-id=544 bgcolor=#fefefe
| 219544 ||  || — || September 8, 2001 || Socorro || LINEAR || H || align=right | 1.0 km || 
|-id=545 bgcolor=#d6d6d6
| 219545 ||  || — || September 7, 2001 || Socorro || LINEAR || 3:2 || align=right | 8.2 km || 
|-id=546 bgcolor=#fefefe
| 219546 ||  || — || September 8, 2001 || Socorro || LINEAR || — || align=right | 1.5 km || 
|-id=547 bgcolor=#E9E9E9
| 219547 ||  || — || September 12, 2001 || Palomar || NEAT || — || align=right | 1.5 km || 
|-id=548 bgcolor=#E9E9E9
| 219548 ||  || — || September 10, 2001 || Socorro || LINEAR || — || align=right | 1.6 km || 
|-id=549 bgcolor=#E9E9E9
| 219549 ||  || — || September 10, 2001 || Socorro || LINEAR || — || align=right data-sort-value="0.68" | 680 m || 
|-id=550 bgcolor=#E9E9E9
| 219550 ||  || — || September 10, 2001 || Socorro || LINEAR || — || align=right | 1.9 km || 
|-id=551 bgcolor=#fefefe
| 219551 ||  || — || September 11, 2001 || Anderson Mesa || LONEOS || H || align=right data-sort-value="0.89" | 890 m || 
|-id=552 bgcolor=#E9E9E9
| 219552 ||  || — || September 12, 2001 || Socorro || LINEAR || — || align=right | 1.2 km || 
|-id=553 bgcolor=#fefefe
| 219553 ||  || — || September 12, 2001 || Socorro || LINEAR || FLO || align=right data-sort-value="0.92" | 920 m || 
|-id=554 bgcolor=#E9E9E9
| 219554 ||  || — || September 12, 2001 || Socorro || LINEAR || — || align=right | 1.2 km || 
|-id=555 bgcolor=#d6d6d6
| 219555 ||  || — || September 12, 2001 || Socorro || LINEAR || 3:2 || align=right | 6.5 km || 
|-id=556 bgcolor=#fefefe
| 219556 ||  || — || September 12, 2001 || Socorro || LINEAR || NYS || align=right | 1.3 km || 
|-id=557 bgcolor=#E9E9E9
| 219557 ||  || — || September 12, 2001 || Socorro || LINEAR || — || align=right | 1.1 km || 
|-id=558 bgcolor=#E9E9E9
| 219558 ||  || — || September 15, 2001 || Palomar || NEAT || — || align=right | 3.8 km || 
|-id=559 bgcolor=#E9E9E9
| 219559 ||  || — || September 10, 2001 || Socorro || LINEAR || GER || align=right | 1.6 km || 
|-id=560 bgcolor=#E9E9E9
| 219560 || 2001 SX || — || September 17, 2001 || Desert Eagle || W. K. Y. Yeung || — || align=right | 1.6 km || 
|-id=561 bgcolor=#fefefe
| 219561 ||  || — || September 16, 2001 || Socorro || LINEAR || V || align=right data-sort-value="0.96" | 960 m || 
|-id=562 bgcolor=#E9E9E9
| 219562 ||  || — || September 16, 2001 || Socorro || LINEAR || — || align=right | 1.1 km || 
|-id=563 bgcolor=#E9E9E9
| 219563 ||  || — || September 16, 2001 || Socorro || LINEAR || — || align=right data-sort-value="0.94" | 940 m || 
|-id=564 bgcolor=#E9E9E9
| 219564 ||  || — || September 20, 2001 || Socorro || LINEAR || — || align=right | 1.3 km || 
|-id=565 bgcolor=#E9E9E9
| 219565 ||  || — || September 20, 2001 || Socorro || LINEAR || — || align=right | 1.1 km || 
|-id=566 bgcolor=#fefefe
| 219566 ||  || — || September 20, 2001 || Socorro || LINEAR || NYS || align=right data-sort-value="0.93" | 930 m || 
|-id=567 bgcolor=#E9E9E9
| 219567 ||  || — || September 20, 2001 || Desert Eagle || W. K. Y. Yeung || — || align=right | 1.5 km || 
|-id=568 bgcolor=#E9E9E9
| 219568 ||  || — || September 16, 2001 || Socorro || LINEAR || — || align=right | 1.8 km || 
|-id=569 bgcolor=#E9E9E9
| 219569 ||  || — || September 16, 2001 || Socorro || LINEAR || — || align=right | 1.2 km || 
|-id=570 bgcolor=#fefefe
| 219570 ||  || — || September 16, 2001 || Socorro || LINEAR || FLO || align=right data-sort-value="0.83" | 830 m || 
|-id=571 bgcolor=#E9E9E9
| 219571 ||  || — || September 16, 2001 || Socorro || LINEAR || — || align=right | 1.3 km || 
|-id=572 bgcolor=#E9E9E9
| 219572 ||  || — || September 16, 2001 || Socorro || LINEAR || — || align=right | 1.8 km || 
|-id=573 bgcolor=#E9E9E9
| 219573 ||  || — || September 16, 2001 || Socorro || LINEAR || — || align=right | 1.1 km || 
|-id=574 bgcolor=#E9E9E9
| 219574 ||  || — || September 17, 2001 || Socorro || LINEAR || — || align=right | 1.6 km || 
|-id=575 bgcolor=#E9E9E9
| 219575 ||  || — || September 19, 2001 || Socorro || LINEAR || — || align=right | 1.0 km || 
|-id=576 bgcolor=#E9E9E9
| 219576 ||  || — || September 19, 2001 || Socorro || LINEAR || — || align=right | 1.6 km || 
|-id=577 bgcolor=#E9E9E9
| 219577 ||  || — || September 19, 2001 || Socorro || LINEAR || — || align=right | 1.0 km || 
|-id=578 bgcolor=#E9E9E9
| 219578 ||  || — || September 19, 2001 || Socorro || LINEAR || — || align=right | 1.2 km || 
|-id=579 bgcolor=#E9E9E9
| 219579 ||  || — || September 19, 2001 || Socorro || LINEAR || — || align=right | 1.4 km || 
|-id=580 bgcolor=#E9E9E9
| 219580 ||  || — || September 19, 2001 || Socorro || LINEAR || — || align=right | 1.0 km || 
|-id=581 bgcolor=#fefefe
| 219581 ||  || — || September 19, 2001 || Socorro || LINEAR || — || align=right data-sort-value="0.98" | 980 m || 
|-id=582 bgcolor=#E9E9E9
| 219582 ||  || — || September 20, 2001 || Socorro || LINEAR || — || align=right data-sort-value="0.80" | 800 m || 
|-id=583 bgcolor=#fefefe
| 219583 ||  || — || September 19, 2001 || Socorro || LINEAR || H || align=right data-sort-value="0.78" | 780 m || 
|-id=584 bgcolor=#fefefe
| 219584 ||  || — || September 19, 2001 || Socorro || LINEAR || NYS || align=right data-sort-value="0.91" | 910 m || 
|-id=585 bgcolor=#E9E9E9
| 219585 ||  || — || September 18, 2001 || Anderson Mesa || LONEOS || — || align=right | 1.3 km || 
|-id=586 bgcolor=#E9E9E9
| 219586 ||  || — || September 20, 2001 || Kitt Peak || Spacewatch || — || align=right | 1.0 km || 
|-id=587 bgcolor=#E9E9E9
| 219587 ||  || — || October 7, 2001 || Palomar || NEAT || — || align=right | 1.1 km || 
|-id=588 bgcolor=#E9E9E9
| 219588 ||  || — || October 9, 2001 || Socorro || LINEAR || — || align=right | 1.5 km || 
|-id=589 bgcolor=#E9E9E9
| 219589 ||  || — || October 14, 2001 || Desert Eagle || W. K. Y. Yeung || — || align=right | 1.6 km || 
|-id=590 bgcolor=#E9E9E9
| 219590 ||  || — || October 15, 2001 || Emerald Lane || L. Ball || — || align=right | 1.3 km || 
|-id=591 bgcolor=#E9E9E9
| 219591 ||  || — || October 11, 2001 || Socorro || LINEAR || — || align=right | 2.1 km || 
|-id=592 bgcolor=#E9E9E9
| 219592 ||  || — || October 14, 2001 || Socorro || LINEAR || — || align=right | 2.1 km || 
|-id=593 bgcolor=#E9E9E9
| 219593 ||  || — || October 14, 2001 || Socorro || LINEAR || HNS || align=right | 2.5 km || 
|-id=594 bgcolor=#E9E9E9
| 219594 ||  || — || October 14, 2001 || Socorro || LINEAR || EUN || align=right | 1.8 km || 
|-id=595 bgcolor=#E9E9E9
| 219595 ||  || — || October 14, 2001 || Socorro || LINEAR || — || align=right | 2.6 km || 
|-id=596 bgcolor=#E9E9E9
| 219596 ||  || — || October 14, 2001 || Socorro || LINEAR || — || align=right | 3.2 km || 
|-id=597 bgcolor=#E9E9E9
| 219597 ||  || — || October 14, 2001 || Socorro || LINEAR || — || align=right | 3.0 km || 
|-id=598 bgcolor=#E9E9E9
| 219598 ||  || — || October 15, 2001 || Desert Eagle || W. K. Y. Yeung || — || align=right | 2.5 km || 
|-id=599 bgcolor=#E9E9E9
| 219599 ||  || — || October 14, 2001 || Socorro || LINEAR || — || align=right | 1.3 km || 
|-id=600 bgcolor=#E9E9E9
| 219600 ||  || — || October 13, 2001 || Socorro || LINEAR || — || align=right | 2.0 km || 
|}

219601–219700 

|-bgcolor=#E9E9E9
| 219601 ||  || — || October 13, 2001 || Socorro || LINEAR || — || align=right | 2.6 km || 
|-id=602 bgcolor=#E9E9E9
| 219602 ||  || — || October 14, 2001 || Socorro || LINEAR || — || align=right | 1.2 km || 
|-id=603 bgcolor=#E9E9E9
| 219603 ||  || — || October 14, 2001 || Socorro || LINEAR || — || align=right | 1.3 km || 
|-id=604 bgcolor=#E9E9E9
| 219604 ||  || — || October 14, 2001 || Socorro || LINEAR || — || align=right | 1.2 km || 
|-id=605 bgcolor=#E9E9E9
| 219605 ||  || — || October 14, 2001 || Socorro || LINEAR || — || align=right | 1.2 km || 
|-id=606 bgcolor=#E9E9E9
| 219606 ||  || — || October 14, 2001 || Socorro || LINEAR || — || align=right | 1.3 km || 
|-id=607 bgcolor=#E9E9E9
| 219607 ||  || — || October 14, 2001 || Socorro || LINEAR || — || align=right | 1.2 km || 
|-id=608 bgcolor=#E9E9E9
| 219608 ||  || — || October 14, 2001 || Socorro || LINEAR || — || align=right | 1.5 km || 
|-id=609 bgcolor=#E9E9E9
| 219609 ||  || — || October 14, 2001 || Socorro || LINEAR || — || align=right | 1.2 km || 
|-id=610 bgcolor=#E9E9E9
| 219610 ||  || — || October 14, 2001 || Socorro || LINEAR || — || align=right | 1.6 km || 
|-id=611 bgcolor=#E9E9E9
| 219611 ||  || — || October 14, 2001 || Socorro || LINEAR || — || align=right | 1.3 km || 
|-id=612 bgcolor=#E9E9E9
| 219612 ||  || — || October 13, 2001 || Socorro || LINEAR || — || align=right | 6.2 km || 
|-id=613 bgcolor=#E9E9E9
| 219613 ||  || — || October 13, 2001 || Socorro || LINEAR || — || align=right | 4.0 km || 
|-id=614 bgcolor=#E9E9E9
| 219614 ||  || — || October 14, 2001 || Socorro || LINEAR || — || align=right | 1.2 km || 
|-id=615 bgcolor=#E9E9E9
| 219615 ||  || — || October 15, 2001 || Socorro || LINEAR || EUN || align=right | 1.9 km || 
|-id=616 bgcolor=#E9E9E9
| 219616 ||  || — || October 15, 2001 || Socorro || LINEAR || EUN || align=right | 2.1 km || 
|-id=617 bgcolor=#E9E9E9
| 219617 ||  || — || October 15, 2001 || Socorro || LINEAR || MAR || align=right | 1.8 km || 
|-id=618 bgcolor=#E9E9E9
| 219618 ||  || — || October 15, 2001 || Socorro || LINEAR || — || align=right | 1.6 km || 
|-id=619 bgcolor=#E9E9E9
| 219619 ||  || — || October 12, 2001 || Haleakala || NEAT || — || align=right | 1.8 km || 
|-id=620 bgcolor=#fefefe
| 219620 ||  || — || October 11, 2001 || Palomar || NEAT || — || align=right | 3.3 km || 
|-id=621 bgcolor=#E9E9E9
| 219621 ||  || — || October 13, 2001 || Socorro || LINEAR || — || align=right | 1.2 km || 
|-id=622 bgcolor=#E9E9E9
| 219622 ||  || — || October 14, 2001 || Socorro || LINEAR || — || align=right | 1.1 km || 
|-id=623 bgcolor=#E9E9E9
| 219623 ||  || — || October 15, 2001 || Socorro || LINEAR || — || align=right | 1.4 km || 
|-id=624 bgcolor=#E9E9E9
| 219624 ||  || — || October 11, 2001 || Socorro || LINEAR || — || align=right | 1.3 km || 
|-id=625 bgcolor=#E9E9E9
| 219625 ||  || — || October 11, 2001 || Socorro || LINEAR || — || align=right | 4.3 km || 
|-id=626 bgcolor=#E9E9E9
| 219626 ||  || — || October 11, 2001 || Palomar || NEAT || — || align=right | 1.3 km || 
|-id=627 bgcolor=#E9E9E9
| 219627 ||  || — || October 13, 2001 || Anderson Mesa || LONEOS || — || align=right | 1.6 km || 
|-id=628 bgcolor=#fefefe
| 219628 ||  || — || October 13, 2001 || Palomar || NEAT || — || align=right | 2.4 km || 
|-id=629 bgcolor=#E9E9E9
| 219629 ||  || — || October 14, 2001 || Socorro || LINEAR || — || align=right | 1.4 km || 
|-id=630 bgcolor=#E9E9E9
| 219630 ||  || — || October 15, 2001 || Palomar || NEAT || — || align=right | 1.6 km || 
|-id=631 bgcolor=#E9E9E9
| 219631 ||  || — || October 14, 2001 || Socorro || LINEAR || — || align=right | 3.9 km || 
|-id=632 bgcolor=#E9E9E9
| 219632 ||  || — || October 22, 2001 || Desert Eagle || W. K. Y. Yeung || — || align=right | 2.1 km || 
|-id=633 bgcolor=#fefefe
| 219633 ||  || — || October 18, 2001 || Socorro || LINEAR || H || align=right data-sort-value="0.82" | 820 m || 
|-id=634 bgcolor=#E9E9E9
| 219634 ||  || — || October 16, 2001 || Socorro || LINEAR || — || align=right | 1.6 km || 
|-id=635 bgcolor=#E9E9E9
| 219635 ||  || — || October 16, 2001 || Socorro || LINEAR || — || align=right | 1.7 km || 
|-id=636 bgcolor=#E9E9E9
| 219636 ||  || — || October 17, 2001 || Socorro || LINEAR || — || align=right | 1.4 km || 
|-id=637 bgcolor=#E9E9E9
| 219637 ||  || — || October 17, 2001 || Socorro || LINEAR || — || align=right | 2.6 km || 
|-id=638 bgcolor=#E9E9E9
| 219638 ||  || — || October 18, 2001 || Socorro || LINEAR || — || align=right | 1.5 km || 
|-id=639 bgcolor=#E9E9E9
| 219639 ||  || — || October 18, 2001 || Socorro || LINEAR || — || align=right | 1.4 km || 
|-id=640 bgcolor=#E9E9E9
| 219640 ||  || — || October 17, 2001 || Kitt Peak || Spacewatch || — || align=right | 1.5 km || 
|-id=641 bgcolor=#E9E9E9
| 219641 ||  || — || October 17, 2001 || Socorro || LINEAR || ADE || align=right | 2.6 km || 
|-id=642 bgcolor=#E9E9E9
| 219642 ||  || — || October 17, 2001 || Socorro || LINEAR || — || align=right | 1.5 km || 
|-id=643 bgcolor=#E9E9E9
| 219643 ||  || — || October 17, 2001 || Socorro || LINEAR || — || align=right | 1.6 km || 
|-id=644 bgcolor=#E9E9E9
| 219644 ||  || — || October 20, 2001 || Socorro || LINEAR || — || align=right | 1.4 km || 
|-id=645 bgcolor=#E9E9E9
| 219645 ||  || — || October 20, 2001 || Socorro || LINEAR || — || align=right | 1.7 km || 
|-id=646 bgcolor=#E9E9E9
| 219646 ||  || — || October 20, 2001 || Socorro || LINEAR || — || align=right | 1.5 km || 
|-id=647 bgcolor=#E9E9E9
| 219647 ||  || — || October 22, 2001 || Socorro || LINEAR || — || align=right | 1.4 km || 
|-id=648 bgcolor=#E9E9E9
| 219648 ||  || — || October 22, 2001 || Socorro || LINEAR || — || align=right | 1.6 km || 
|-id=649 bgcolor=#E9E9E9
| 219649 ||  || — || October 17, 2001 || Socorro || LINEAR || EUN || align=right | 2.7 km || 
|-id=650 bgcolor=#E9E9E9
| 219650 ||  || — || October 21, 2001 || Socorro || LINEAR || — || align=right | 2.0 km || 
|-id=651 bgcolor=#E9E9E9
| 219651 ||  || — || October 23, 2001 || Socorro || LINEAR || EUN || align=right | 1.4 km || 
|-id=652 bgcolor=#E9E9E9
| 219652 ||  || — || October 23, 2001 || Socorro || LINEAR || HNS || align=right | 2.4 km || 
|-id=653 bgcolor=#E9E9E9
| 219653 ||  || — || October 18, 2001 || Palomar || NEAT || — || align=right | 1.2 km || 
|-id=654 bgcolor=#E9E9E9
| 219654 ||  || — || October 18, 2001 || Palomar || NEAT || — || align=right | 1.2 km || 
|-id=655 bgcolor=#E9E9E9
| 219655 ||  || — || October 23, 2001 || Anderson Mesa || LONEOS || MAR || align=right | 1.7 km || 
|-id=656 bgcolor=#E9E9E9
| 219656 ||  || — || October 24, 2001 || Palomar || NEAT || — || align=right | 1.1 km || 
|-id=657 bgcolor=#E9E9E9
| 219657 ||  || — || November 10, 2001 || Heppenheim || Starkenburg Obs. || — || align=right | 5.4 km || 
|-id=658 bgcolor=#E9E9E9
| 219658 ||  || — || November 9, 2001 || Kitt Peak || Spacewatch || — || align=right | 1.6 km || 
|-id=659 bgcolor=#E9E9E9
| 219659 ||  || — || November 9, 2001 || Socorro || LINEAR || — || align=right | 1.2 km || 
|-id=660 bgcolor=#E9E9E9
| 219660 ||  || — || November 10, 2001 || Socorro || LINEAR || EUN || align=right | 2.0 km || 
|-id=661 bgcolor=#E9E9E9
| 219661 ||  || — || November 10, 2001 || Socorro || LINEAR || — || align=right | 2.3 km || 
|-id=662 bgcolor=#E9E9E9
| 219662 ||  || — || November 10, 2001 || Socorro || LINEAR || — || align=right | 2.1 km || 
|-id=663 bgcolor=#E9E9E9
| 219663 ||  || — || November 10, 2001 || Socorro || LINEAR || — || align=right | 2.2 km || 
|-id=664 bgcolor=#E9E9E9
| 219664 ||  || — || November 9, 2001 || Bergisch Gladbach || W. Bickel || — || align=right | 1.7 km || 
|-id=665 bgcolor=#E9E9E9
| 219665 ||  || — || November 9, 2001 || Socorro || LINEAR || — || align=right | 1.2 km || 
|-id=666 bgcolor=#E9E9E9
| 219666 ||  || — || November 9, 2001 || Socorro || LINEAR || — || align=right | 1.2 km || 
|-id=667 bgcolor=#E9E9E9
| 219667 ||  || — || November 9, 2001 || Socorro || LINEAR || — || align=right | 1.6 km || 
|-id=668 bgcolor=#E9E9E9
| 219668 ||  || — || November 9, 2001 || Socorro || LINEAR || — || align=right | 2.7 km || 
|-id=669 bgcolor=#E9E9E9
| 219669 ||  || — || November 9, 2001 || Socorro || LINEAR || — || align=right | 1.7 km || 
|-id=670 bgcolor=#E9E9E9
| 219670 ||  || — || November 10, 2001 || Socorro || LINEAR || RAF || align=right | 1.5 km || 
|-id=671 bgcolor=#E9E9E9
| 219671 ||  || — || November 10, 2001 || Socorro || LINEAR || RAF || align=right | 1.6 km || 
|-id=672 bgcolor=#E9E9E9
| 219672 ||  || — || November 9, 2001 || Palomar || NEAT || — || align=right | 2.9 km || 
|-id=673 bgcolor=#E9E9E9
| 219673 ||  || — || November 12, 2001 || Haleakala || NEAT || MIT || align=right | 4.3 km || 
|-id=674 bgcolor=#E9E9E9
| 219674 ||  || — || November 15, 2001 || Socorro || LINEAR || EUN || align=right | 1.8 km || 
|-id=675 bgcolor=#E9E9E9
| 219675 ||  || — || November 15, 2001 || Socorro || LINEAR || — || align=right | 1.8 km || 
|-id=676 bgcolor=#E9E9E9
| 219676 ||  || — || November 12, 2001 || Socorro || LINEAR || — || align=right | 1.1 km || 
|-id=677 bgcolor=#E9E9E9
| 219677 ||  || — || November 12, 2001 || Socorro || LINEAR || AER || align=right | 2.2 km || 
|-id=678 bgcolor=#E9E9E9
| 219678 ||  || — || November 12, 2001 || Socorro || LINEAR || — || align=right | 1.7 km || 
|-id=679 bgcolor=#E9E9E9
| 219679 ||  || — || November 12, 2001 || Socorro || LINEAR || — || align=right | 2.4 km || 
|-id=680 bgcolor=#E9E9E9
| 219680 ||  || — || November 17, 2001 || Kitt Peak || Spacewatch || — || align=right | 1.6 km || 
|-id=681 bgcolor=#E9E9E9
| 219681 ||  || — || November 17, 2001 || Socorro || LINEAR || — || align=right | 1.3 km || 
|-id=682 bgcolor=#E9E9E9
| 219682 ||  || — || November 17, 2001 || Socorro || LINEAR || KRM || align=right | 3.3 km || 
|-id=683 bgcolor=#E9E9E9
| 219683 ||  || — || November 17, 2001 || Socorro || LINEAR || — || align=right | 1.7 km || 
|-id=684 bgcolor=#E9E9E9
| 219684 ||  || — || November 17, 2001 || Socorro || LINEAR || — || align=right | 1.8 km || 
|-id=685 bgcolor=#E9E9E9
| 219685 ||  || — || November 17, 2001 || Socorro || LINEAR || ADE || align=right | 2.6 km || 
|-id=686 bgcolor=#E9E9E9
| 219686 ||  || — || November 17, 2001 || Socorro || LINEAR || — || align=right | 1.1 km || 
|-id=687 bgcolor=#E9E9E9
| 219687 ||  || — || November 17, 2001 || Socorro || LINEAR || — || align=right | 2.1 km || 
|-id=688 bgcolor=#E9E9E9
| 219688 ||  || — || November 17, 2001 || Socorro || LINEAR || RAF || align=right | 1.5 km || 
|-id=689 bgcolor=#E9E9E9
| 219689 ||  || — || November 17, 2001 || Socorro || LINEAR || — || align=right | 1.8 km || 
|-id=690 bgcolor=#E9E9E9
| 219690 ||  || — || November 19, 2001 || Socorro || LINEAR || EUN || align=right | 2.2 km || 
|-id=691 bgcolor=#E9E9E9
| 219691 ||  || — || November 19, 2001 || Socorro || LINEAR || — || align=right | 1.2 km || 
|-id=692 bgcolor=#E9E9E9
| 219692 ||  || — || November 21, 2001 || Socorro || LINEAR || — || align=right | 1.2 km || 
|-id=693 bgcolor=#E9E9E9
| 219693 ||  || — || December 8, 2001 || Socorro || LINEAR || — || align=right | 2.1 km || 
|-id=694 bgcolor=#E9E9E9
| 219694 ||  || — || December 9, 2001 || Socorro || LINEAR || — || align=right | 2.8 km || 
|-id=695 bgcolor=#E9E9E9
| 219695 ||  || — || December 10, 2001 || Uccle || T. Pauwels || — || align=right | 2.3 km || 
|-id=696 bgcolor=#E9E9E9
| 219696 ||  || — || December 9, 2001 || Socorro || LINEAR || — || align=right | 2.6 km || 
|-id=697 bgcolor=#E9E9E9
| 219697 ||  || — || December 9, 2001 || Socorro || LINEAR || IAN || align=right | 1.7 km || 
|-id=698 bgcolor=#E9E9E9
| 219698 ||  || — || December 9, 2001 || Socorro || LINEAR || — || align=right | 2.1 km || 
|-id=699 bgcolor=#E9E9E9
| 219699 ||  || — || December 9, 2001 || Socorro || LINEAR || — || align=right | 3.5 km || 
|-id=700 bgcolor=#E9E9E9
| 219700 ||  || — || December 10, 2001 || Socorro || LINEAR || — || align=right | 1.6 km || 
|}

219701–219800 

|-bgcolor=#E9E9E9
| 219701 ||  || — || December 11, 2001 || Socorro || LINEAR || — || align=right | 4.5 km || 
|-id=702 bgcolor=#E9E9E9
| 219702 ||  || — || December 11, 2001 || Kitt Peak || Spacewatch || — || align=right | 2.5 km || 
|-id=703 bgcolor=#E9E9E9
| 219703 ||  || — || December 9, 2001 || Socorro || LINEAR || EUN || align=right | 2.1 km || 
|-id=704 bgcolor=#E9E9E9
| 219704 ||  || — || December 9, 2001 || Socorro || LINEAR || — || align=right | 1.9 km || 
|-id=705 bgcolor=#E9E9E9
| 219705 ||  || — || December 9, 2001 || Socorro || LINEAR || — || align=right | 2.0 km || 
|-id=706 bgcolor=#E9E9E9
| 219706 ||  || — || December 9, 2001 || Socorro || LINEAR || RAF || align=right | 1.5 km || 
|-id=707 bgcolor=#E9E9E9
| 219707 ||  || — || December 9, 2001 || Socorro || LINEAR || — || align=right | 3.1 km || 
|-id=708 bgcolor=#fefefe
| 219708 ||  || — || December 9, 2001 || Socorro || LINEAR || H || align=right | 1.4 km || 
|-id=709 bgcolor=#E9E9E9
| 219709 ||  || — || December 10, 2001 || Socorro || LINEAR || — || align=right | 1.8 km || 
|-id=710 bgcolor=#E9E9E9
| 219710 ||  || — || December 10, 2001 || Socorro || LINEAR || — || align=right | 1.2 km || 
|-id=711 bgcolor=#E9E9E9
| 219711 ||  || — || December 10, 2001 || Socorro || LINEAR || — || align=right | 2.0 km || 
|-id=712 bgcolor=#E9E9E9
| 219712 ||  || — || December 10, 2001 || Socorro || LINEAR || — || align=right | 4.4 km || 
|-id=713 bgcolor=#E9E9E9
| 219713 ||  || — || December 11, 2001 || Socorro || LINEAR || — || align=right | 1.5 km || 
|-id=714 bgcolor=#E9E9E9
| 219714 ||  || — || December 11, 2001 || Socorro || LINEAR || — || align=right | 2.1 km || 
|-id=715 bgcolor=#E9E9E9
| 219715 ||  || — || December 11, 2001 || Socorro || LINEAR || — || align=right | 1.6 km || 
|-id=716 bgcolor=#E9E9E9
| 219716 ||  || — || December 11, 2001 || Socorro || LINEAR || — || align=right | 2.1 km || 
|-id=717 bgcolor=#E9E9E9
| 219717 ||  || — || December 10, 2001 || Socorro || LINEAR || — || align=right | 1.4 km || 
|-id=718 bgcolor=#E9E9E9
| 219718 ||  || — || December 10, 2001 || Socorro || LINEAR || — || align=right | 1.4 km || 
|-id=719 bgcolor=#E9E9E9
| 219719 ||  || — || December 11, 2001 || Uccle || T. Pauwels || — || align=right | 2.4 km || 
|-id=720 bgcolor=#E9E9E9
| 219720 ||  || — || December 11, 2001 || Socorro || LINEAR || — || align=right | 1.5 km || 
|-id=721 bgcolor=#E9E9E9
| 219721 ||  || — || December 11, 2001 || Socorro || LINEAR || — || align=right | 1.8 km || 
|-id=722 bgcolor=#E9E9E9
| 219722 ||  || — || December 13, 2001 || Socorro || LINEAR || — || align=right | 3.0 km || 
|-id=723 bgcolor=#E9E9E9
| 219723 ||  || — || December 14, 2001 || Socorro || LINEAR || — || align=right | 1.1 km || 
|-id=724 bgcolor=#E9E9E9
| 219724 ||  || — || December 14, 2001 || Socorro || LINEAR || — || align=right | 2.1 km || 
|-id=725 bgcolor=#E9E9E9
| 219725 ||  || — || December 14, 2001 || Socorro || LINEAR || — || align=right | 1.3 km || 
|-id=726 bgcolor=#E9E9E9
| 219726 ||  || — || December 14, 2001 || Socorro || LINEAR || — || align=right | 2.4 km || 
|-id=727 bgcolor=#E9E9E9
| 219727 ||  || — || December 14, 2001 || Socorro || LINEAR || — || align=right | 2.4 km || 
|-id=728 bgcolor=#E9E9E9
| 219728 ||  || — || December 14, 2001 || Socorro || LINEAR || — || align=right | 2.7 km || 
|-id=729 bgcolor=#E9E9E9
| 219729 ||  || — || December 14, 2001 || Socorro || LINEAR || — || align=right | 2.3 km || 
|-id=730 bgcolor=#E9E9E9
| 219730 ||  || — || December 14, 2001 || Socorro || LINEAR || — || align=right | 1.9 km || 
|-id=731 bgcolor=#E9E9E9
| 219731 ||  || — || December 14, 2001 || Socorro || LINEAR || — || align=right | 2.7 km || 
|-id=732 bgcolor=#E9E9E9
| 219732 ||  || — || December 14, 2001 || Socorro || LINEAR || — || align=right | 3.1 km || 
|-id=733 bgcolor=#E9E9E9
| 219733 ||  || — || December 14, 2001 || Socorro || LINEAR || — || align=right | 1.9 km || 
|-id=734 bgcolor=#E9E9E9
| 219734 ||  || — || December 14, 2001 || Socorro || LINEAR || — || align=right | 1.9 km || 
|-id=735 bgcolor=#E9E9E9
| 219735 ||  || — || December 14, 2001 || Socorro || LINEAR || — || align=right | 2.2 km || 
|-id=736 bgcolor=#E9E9E9
| 219736 ||  || — || December 14, 2001 || Socorro || LINEAR || — || align=right | 2.1 km || 
|-id=737 bgcolor=#E9E9E9
| 219737 ||  || — || December 14, 2001 || Socorro || LINEAR || PAD || align=right | 2.6 km || 
|-id=738 bgcolor=#E9E9E9
| 219738 ||  || — || December 14, 2001 || Socorro || LINEAR || — || align=right | 2.9 km || 
|-id=739 bgcolor=#E9E9E9
| 219739 ||  || — || December 14, 2001 || Socorro || LINEAR || — || align=right | 2.6 km || 
|-id=740 bgcolor=#E9E9E9
| 219740 ||  || — || December 11, 2001 || Socorro || LINEAR || MRX || align=right | 1.4 km || 
|-id=741 bgcolor=#E9E9E9
| 219741 ||  || — || December 15, 2001 || Socorro || LINEAR || — || align=right | 1.4 km || 
|-id=742 bgcolor=#E9E9E9
| 219742 ||  || — || December 15, 2001 || Socorro || LINEAR || — || align=right | 2.3 km || 
|-id=743 bgcolor=#E9E9E9
| 219743 ||  || — || December 15, 2001 || Socorro || LINEAR || RAF || align=right | 1.9 km || 
|-id=744 bgcolor=#E9E9E9
| 219744 ||  || — || December 15, 2001 || Socorro || LINEAR || — || align=right | 1.8 km || 
|-id=745 bgcolor=#E9E9E9
| 219745 ||  || — || December 15, 2001 || Socorro || LINEAR || — || align=right | 3.8 km || 
|-id=746 bgcolor=#E9E9E9
| 219746 ||  || — || December 15, 2001 || Socorro || LINEAR || — || align=right | 3.4 km || 
|-id=747 bgcolor=#E9E9E9
| 219747 ||  || — || December 15, 2001 || Socorro || LINEAR || — || align=right | 2.4 km || 
|-id=748 bgcolor=#E9E9E9
| 219748 ||  || — || December 13, 2001 || Palomar || NEAT || — || align=right | 2.5 km || 
|-id=749 bgcolor=#E9E9E9
| 219749 ||  || — || December 7, 2001 || Socorro || LINEAR || — || align=right | 2.7 km || 
|-id=750 bgcolor=#E9E9E9
| 219750 || 2001 YE || — || December 17, 2001 || Palomar || NEAT || — || align=right | 3.8 km || 
|-id=751 bgcolor=#E9E9E9
| 219751 ||  || — || December 17, 2001 || Socorro || LINEAR || — || align=right | 4.7 km || 
|-id=752 bgcolor=#E9E9E9
| 219752 ||  || — || December 17, 2001 || Socorro || LINEAR || — || align=right | 1.5 km || 
|-id=753 bgcolor=#E9E9E9
| 219753 ||  || — || December 18, 2001 || Socorro || LINEAR || — || align=right | 2.8 km || 
|-id=754 bgcolor=#E9E9E9
| 219754 ||  || — || December 18, 2001 || Socorro || LINEAR || — || align=right | 1.6 km || 
|-id=755 bgcolor=#E9E9E9
| 219755 ||  || — || December 18, 2001 || Socorro || LINEAR || — || align=right | 1.2 km || 
|-id=756 bgcolor=#E9E9E9
| 219756 ||  || — || December 18, 2001 || Socorro || LINEAR || WIT || align=right | 1.3 km || 
|-id=757 bgcolor=#E9E9E9
| 219757 ||  || — || December 18, 2001 || Socorro || LINEAR || — || align=right | 2.2 km || 
|-id=758 bgcolor=#E9E9E9
| 219758 ||  || — || December 18, 2001 || Socorro || LINEAR || — || align=right | 2.0 km || 
|-id=759 bgcolor=#E9E9E9
| 219759 ||  || — || December 18, 2001 || Socorro || LINEAR || — || align=right | 2.0 km || 
|-id=760 bgcolor=#E9E9E9
| 219760 ||  || — || December 18, 2001 || Socorro || LINEAR || — || align=right | 2.7 km || 
|-id=761 bgcolor=#E9E9E9
| 219761 ||  || — || December 18, 2001 || Socorro || LINEAR || — || align=right | 2.5 km || 
|-id=762 bgcolor=#E9E9E9
| 219762 ||  || — || December 18, 2001 || Socorro || LINEAR || — || align=right | 3.2 km || 
|-id=763 bgcolor=#E9E9E9
| 219763 ||  || — || December 18, 2001 || Socorro || LINEAR || — || align=right | 2.0 km || 
|-id=764 bgcolor=#E9E9E9
| 219764 ||  || — || December 18, 2001 || Socorro || LINEAR || JUN || align=right | 1.7 km || 
|-id=765 bgcolor=#E9E9E9
| 219765 ||  || — || December 17, 2001 || Palomar || NEAT || MIT || align=right | 5.2 km || 
|-id=766 bgcolor=#E9E9E9
| 219766 ||  || — || December 18, 2001 || Kitt Peak || Spacewatch || — || align=right | 1.2 km || 
|-id=767 bgcolor=#E9E9E9
| 219767 ||  || — || December 17, 2001 || Socorro || LINEAR || — || align=right | 3.0 km || 
|-id=768 bgcolor=#E9E9E9
| 219768 ||  || — || December 18, 2001 || Socorro || LINEAR || — || align=right | 4.3 km || 
|-id=769 bgcolor=#E9E9E9
| 219769 ||  || — || December 17, 2001 || Socorro || LINEAR || — || align=right | 2.8 km || 
|-id=770 bgcolor=#E9E9E9
| 219770 ||  || — || December 17, 2001 || Socorro || LINEAR || — || align=right | 2.4 km || 
|-id=771 bgcolor=#E9E9E9
| 219771 ||  || — || December 22, 2001 || Socorro || LINEAR || — || align=right | 2.1 km || 
|-id=772 bgcolor=#E9E9E9
| 219772 ||  || — || December 22, 2001 || Socorro || LINEAR || ADE || align=right | 3.3 km || 
|-id=773 bgcolor=#E9E9E9
| 219773 ||  || — || December 20, 2001 || Palomar || NEAT || — || align=right | 3.5 km || 
|-id=774 bgcolor=#E9E9E9
| 219774 ||  || — || December 18, 2001 || Anderson Mesa || LONEOS || slow || align=right | 1.9 km || 
|-id=775 bgcolor=#fefefe
| 219775 ||  || — || January 6, 2002 || Socorro || LINEAR || H || align=right data-sort-value="0.80" | 800 m || 
|-id=776 bgcolor=#E9E9E9
| 219776 ||  || — || January 9, 2002 || Oaxaca || J. M. Roe || — || align=right | 3.0 km || 
|-id=777 bgcolor=#E9E9E9
| 219777 ||  || — || January 4, 2002 || Palomar || NEAT || — || align=right | 4.1 km || 
|-id=778 bgcolor=#FA8072
| 219778 ||  || — || January 6, 2002 || Kitt Peak || Spacewatch || — || align=right | 2.6 km || 
|-id=779 bgcolor=#E9E9E9
| 219779 ||  || — || January 11, 2002 || Desert Eagle || W. K. Y. Yeung || IAN || align=right | 1.9 km || 
|-id=780 bgcolor=#E9E9E9
| 219780 ||  || — || January 6, 2002 || Socorro || LINEAR || IAN || align=right | 1.4 km || 
|-id=781 bgcolor=#E9E9E9
| 219781 ||  || — || January 8, 2002 || Palomar || NEAT || — || align=right | 1.6 km || 
|-id=782 bgcolor=#E9E9E9
| 219782 ||  || — || January 7, 2002 || Anderson Mesa || LONEOS || — || align=right | 3.3 km || 
|-id=783 bgcolor=#E9E9E9
| 219783 ||  || — || January 7, 2002 || Anderson Mesa || LONEOS || — || align=right | 3.2 km || 
|-id=784 bgcolor=#E9E9E9
| 219784 ||  || — || January 9, 2002 || Socorro || LINEAR || — || align=right | 2.9 km || 
|-id=785 bgcolor=#E9E9E9
| 219785 ||  || — || January 11, 2002 || Socorro || LINEAR || — || align=right | 2.4 km || 
|-id=786 bgcolor=#E9E9E9
| 219786 ||  || — || January 8, 2002 || Socorro || LINEAR || — || align=right | 1.4 km || 
|-id=787 bgcolor=#E9E9E9
| 219787 ||  || — || January 9, 2002 || Socorro || LINEAR || — || align=right | 1.8 km || 
|-id=788 bgcolor=#E9E9E9
| 219788 ||  || — || January 9, 2002 || Socorro || LINEAR || — || align=right | 1.7 km || 
|-id=789 bgcolor=#E9E9E9
| 219789 ||  || — || January 9, 2002 || Socorro || LINEAR || NEM || align=right | 3.3 km || 
|-id=790 bgcolor=#E9E9E9
| 219790 ||  || — || January 9, 2002 || Socorro || LINEAR || — || align=right | 1.5 km || 
|-id=791 bgcolor=#E9E9E9
| 219791 ||  || — || January 8, 2002 || Socorro || LINEAR || — || align=right | 2.8 km || 
|-id=792 bgcolor=#E9E9E9
| 219792 ||  || — || January 8, 2002 || Socorro || LINEAR || — || align=right | 1.4 km || 
|-id=793 bgcolor=#E9E9E9
| 219793 ||  || — || January 8, 2002 || Socorro || LINEAR || — || align=right | 2.2 km || 
|-id=794 bgcolor=#E9E9E9
| 219794 ||  || — || January 9, 2002 || Socorro || LINEAR || — || align=right | 2.6 km || 
|-id=795 bgcolor=#E9E9E9
| 219795 ||  || — || January 9, 2002 || Socorro || LINEAR || — || align=right | 1.9 km || 
|-id=796 bgcolor=#E9E9E9
| 219796 ||  || — || January 8, 2002 || Socorro || LINEAR || — || align=right | 2.7 km || 
|-id=797 bgcolor=#E9E9E9
| 219797 ||  || — || January 8, 2002 || Socorro || LINEAR || — || align=right | 2.8 km || 
|-id=798 bgcolor=#E9E9E9
| 219798 ||  || — || January 9, 2002 || Socorro || LINEAR || — || align=right | 1.8 km || 
|-id=799 bgcolor=#E9E9E9
| 219799 ||  || — || January 13, 2002 || Socorro || LINEAR || WIT || align=right | 1.5 km || 
|-id=800 bgcolor=#E9E9E9
| 219800 ||  || — || January 13, 2002 || Socorro || LINEAR || — || align=right | 2.4 km || 
|}

219801–219900 

|-bgcolor=#E9E9E9
| 219801 ||  || — || January 13, 2002 || Socorro || LINEAR || — || align=right | 1.8 km || 
|-id=802 bgcolor=#E9E9E9
| 219802 ||  || — || January 14, 2002 || Socorro || LINEAR || — || align=right | 2.2 km || 
|-id=803 bgcolor=#E9E9E9
| 219803 ||  || — || January 14, 2002 || Socorro || LINEAR || — || align=right | 2.0 km || 
|-id=804 bgcolor=#E9E9E9
| 219804 ||  || — || January 14, 2002 || Socorro || LINEAR || — || align=right | 1.7 km || 
|-id=805 bgcolor=#E9E9E9
| 219805 ||  || — || January 13, 2002 || Socorro || LINEAR || NEM || align=right | 3.1 km || 
|-id=806 bgcolor=#E9E9E9
| 219806 ||  || — || January 13, 2002 || Socorro || LINEAR || — || align=right | 3.7 km || 
|-id=807 bgcolor=#E9E9E9
| 219807 ||  || — || January 14, 2002 || Socorro || LINEAR || — || align=right | 1.9 km || 
|-id=808 bgcolor=#E9E9E9
| 219808 ||  || — || January 5, 2002 || Palomar || NEAT || MAR || align=right | 2.6 km || 
|-id=809 bgcolor=#E9E9E9
| 219809 ||  || — || January 8, 2002 || Socorro || LINEAR || EUN || align=right | 1.8 km || 
|-id=810 bgcolor=#E9E9E9
| 219810 ||  || — || January 8, 2002 || Socorro || LINEAR || — || align=right | 3.5 km || 
|-id=811 bgcolor=#E9E9E9
| 219811 ||  || — || January 10, 2002 || Palomar || NEAT || — || align=right | 2.6 km || 
|-id=812 bgcolor=#E9E9E9
| 219812 ||  || — || January 12, 2002 || Kitt Peak || Spacewatch || NEM || align=right | 3.1 km || 
|-id=813 bgcolor=#E9E9E9
| 219813 ||  || — || January 14, 2002 || Palomar || NEAT || EUN || align=right | 2.2 km || 
|-id=814 bgcolor=#E9E9E9
| 219814 ||  || — || January 18, 2002 || Anderson Mesa || LONEOS || JUN || align=right | 1.5 km || 
|-id=815 bgcolor=#E9E9E9
| 219815 ||  || — || January 19, 2002 || Anderson Mesa || LONEOS || — || align=right | 3.4 km || 
|-id=816 bgcolor=#E9E9E9
| 219816 ||  || — || January 23, 2002 || Socorro || LINEAR || — || align=right | 3.0 km || 
|-id=817 bgcolor=#E9E9E9
| 219817 ||  || — || January 23, 2002 || Socorro || LINEAR || — || align=right | 1.6 km || 
|-id=818 bgcolor=#E9E9E9
| 219818 ||  || — || January 23, 2002 || Socorro || LINEAR || — || align=right | 3.0 km || 
|-id=819 bgcolor=#E9E9E9
| 219819 ||  || — || January 23, 2002 || Socorro || LINEAR || — || align=right | 2.5 km || 
|-id=820 bgcolor=#E9E9E9
| 219820 ||  || — || January 26, 2002 || Socorro || LINEAR || BAR || align=right | 1.9 km || 
|-id=821 bgcolor=#E9E9E9
| 219821 ||  || — || January 17, 2002 || Palomar || NEAT || — || align=right | 2.4 km || 
|-id=822 bgcolor=#E9E9E9
| 219822 ||  || — || February 3, 2002 || Palomar || NEAT || — || align=right | 1.5 km || 
|-id=823 bgcolor=#E9E9E9
| 219823 ||  || — || February 6, 2002 || Socorro || LINEAR || — || align=right | 4.1 km || 
|-id=824 bgcolor=#E9E9E9
| 219824 ||  || — || February 6, 2002 || Socorro || LINEAR || — || align=right | 3.3 km || 
|-id=825 bgcolor=#E9E9E9
| 219825 ||  || — || February 4, 2002 || Palomar || NEAT || — || align=right | 3.7 km || 
|-id=826 bgcolor=#E9E9E9
| 219826 ||  || — || February 6, 2002 || Socorro || LINEAR || — || align=right | 2.5 km || 
|-id=827 bgcolor=#E9E9E9
| 219827 ||  || — || February 7, 2002 || Socorro || LINEAR || MRX || align=right | 1.5 km || 
|-id=828 bgcolor=#E9E9E9
| 219828 ||  || — || February 7, 2002 || Socorro || LINEAR || — || align=right | 3.7 km || 
|-id=829 bgcolor=#E9E9E9
| 219829 ||  || — || February 7, 2002 || San Marcello || L. Tesi, M. Tombelli || ADE || align=right | 3.3 km || 
|-id=830 bgcolor=#E9E9E9
| 219830 ||  || — || February 3, 2002 || Haleakala || NEAT || MRX || align=right | 1.3 km || 
|-id=831 bgcolor=#E9E9E9
| 219831 ||  || — || February 7, 2002 || Socorro || LINEAR || — || align=right | 4.0 km || 
|-id=832 bgcolor=#E9E9E9
| 219832 ||  || — || February 6, 2002 || Socorro || LINEAR || GEF || align=right | 2.2 km || 
|-id=833 bgcolor=#E9E9E9
| 219833 ||  || — || February 7, 2002 || Socorro || LINEAR || AST || align=right | 2.5 km || 
|-id=834 bgcolor=#C2FFFF
| 219834 ||  || — || February 7, 2002 || Socorro || LINEAR || L4 || align=right | 15 km || 
|-id=835 bgcolor=#C2FFFF
| 219835 ||  || — || February 7, 2002 || Socorro || LINEAR || L4ERY || align=right | 11 km || 
|-id=836 bgcolor=#E9E9E9
| 219836 ||  || — || February 7, 2002 || Socorro || LINEAR || — || align=right | 3.2 km || 
|-id=837 bgcolor=#C2FFFF
| 219837 ||  || — || February 7, 2002 || Socorro || LINEAR || L4 || align=right | 15 km || 
|-id=838 bgcolor=#E9E9E9
| 219838 ||  || — || February 7, 2002 || Socorro || LINEAR || — || align=right | 2.0 km || 
|-id=839 bgcolor=#E9E9E9
| 219839 ||  || — || February 7, 2002 || Socorro || LINEAR || — || align=right | 3.5 km || 
|-id=840 bgcolor=#E9E9E9
| 219840 ||  || — || February 7, 2002 || Socorro || LINEAR || — || align=right | 2.2 km || 
|-id=841 bgcolor=#E9E9E9
| 219841 ||  || — || February 8, 2002 || Socorro || LINEAR || — || align=right | 1.6 km || 
|-id=842 bgcolor=#E9E9E9
| 219842 ||  || — || February 9, 2002 || Socorro || LINEAR || — || align=right | 1.4 km || 
|-id=843 bgcolor=#E9E9E9
| 219843 ||  || — || February 10, 2002 || Socorro || LINEAR || — || align=right | 3.3 km || 
|-id=844 bgcolor=#C2FFFF
| 219844 ||  || — || February 10, 2002 || Socorro || LINEAR || L4 || align=right | 11 km || 
|-id=845 bgcolor=#E9E9E9
| 219845 ||  || — || February 10, 2002 || Socorro || LINEAR || — || align=right | 1.5 km || 
|-id=846 bgcolor=#E9E9E9
| 219846 ||  || — || February 10, 2002 || Socorro || LINEAR || — || align=right | 2.8 km || 
|-id=847 bgcolor=#d6d6d6
| 219847 ||  || — || February 10, 2002 || Socorro || LINEAR || CHA || align=right | 2.8 km || 
|-id=848 bgcolor=#E9E9E9
| 219848 ||  || — || February 10, 2002 || Socorro || LINEAR || — || align=right | 3.2 km || 
|-id=849 bgcolor=#d6d6d6
| 219849 ||  || — || February 10, 2002 || Socorro || LINEAR || KOR || align=right | 1.9 km || 
|-id=850 bgcolor=#d6d6d6
| 219850 ||  || — || February 10, 2002 || Socorro || LINEAR || — || align=right | 3.0 km || 
|-id=851 bgcolor=#E9E9E9
| 219851 ||  || — || February 10, 2002 || Socorro || LINEAR || — || align=right | 3.2 km || 
|-id=852 bgcolor=#E9E9E9
| 219852 ||  || — || February 10, 2002 || Socorro || LINEAR || — || align=right | 1.5 km || 
|-id=853 bgcolor=#d6d6d6
| 219853 ||  || — || February 10, 2002 || Socorro || LINEAR || — || align=right | 3.4 km || 
|-id=854 bgcolor=#d6d6d6
| 219854 ||  || — || February 10, 2002 || Socorro || LINEAR || — || align=right | 5.2 km || 
|-id=855 bgcolor=#d6d6d6
| 219855 ||  || — || February 10, 2002 || Socorro || LINEAR || — || align=right | 3.3 km || 
|-id=856 bgcolor=#E9E9E9
| 219856 ||  || — || February 8, 2002 || Palomar || NEAT || — || align=right | 2.0 km || 
|-id=857 bgcolor=#C2FFFF
| 219857 ||  || — || February 11, 2002 || Kitt Peak || Spacewatch || L4 || align=right | 8.7 km || 
|-id=858 bgcolor=#E9E9E9
| 219858 ||  || — || February 8, 2002 || Socorro || LINEAR || — || align=right | 2.3 km || 
|-id=859 bgcolor=#E9E9E9
| 219859 ||  || — || February 14, 2002 || Haleakala || NEAT || MIT || align=right | 4.2 km || 
|-id=860 bgcolor=#E9E9E9
| 219860 ||  || — || February 15, 2002 || Kitt Peak || Spacewatch || — || align=right | 3.6 km || 
|-id=861 bgcolor=#d6d6d6
| 219861 ||  || — || February 6, 2002 || Kitt Peak || M. W. Buie || KOR || align=right | 1.8 km || 
|-id=862 bgcolor=#E9E9E9
| 219862 ||  || — || February 3, 2002 || Anderson Mesa || LONEOS || — || align=right | 3.4 km || 
|-id=863 bgcolor=#E9E9E9
| 219863 ||  || — || February 4, 2002 || Anderson Mesa || LONEOS || — || align=right | 3.1 km || 
|-id=864 bgcolor=#E9E9E9
| 219864 ||  || — || February 5, 2002 || Palomar || NEAT || AGN || align=right | 1.8 km || 
|-id=865 bgcolor=#d6d6d6
| 219865 ||  || — || February 5, 2002 || Palomar || NEAT || — || align=right | 4.3 km || 
|-id=866 bgcolor=#C2FFFF
| 219866 ||  || — || February 7, 2002 || Palomar || NEAT || L4 || align=right | 9.9 km || 
|-id=867 bgcolor=#E9E9E9
| 219867 ||  || — || February 7, 2002 || Kitt Peak || Spacewatch || — || align=right | 2.3 km || 
|-id=868 bgcolor=#E9E9E9
| 219868 ||  || — || February 8, 2002 || Kitt Peak || Spacewatch || HEN || align=right | 1.6 km || 
|-id=869 bgcolor=#E9E9E9
| 219869 ||  || — || February 7, 2002 || Palomar || NEAT || AGN || align=right | 1.7 km || 
|-id=870 bgcolor=#d6d6d6
| 219870 ||  || — || February 8, 2002 || Kitt Peak || Spacewatch || — || align=right | 3.7 km || 
|-id=871 bgcolor=#E9E9E9
| 219871 ||  || — || February 10, 2002 || Socorro || LINEAR || — || align=right | 4.0 km || 
|-id=872 bgcolor=#E9E9E9
| 219872 ||  || — || February 12, 2002 || Socorro || LINEAR || — || align=right | 2.7 km || 
|-id=873 bgcolor=#E9E9E9
| 219873 ||  || — || February 8, 2002 || Socorro || LINEAR || WIT || align=right | 1.6 km || 
|-id=874 bgcolor=#E9E9E9
| 219874 ||  || — || February 13, 2002 || Apache Point || SDSS || HOF || align=right | 2.8 km || 
|-id=875 bgcolor=#E9E9E9
| 219875 ||  || — || February 16, 2002 || Palomar || NEAT || — || align=right | 1.9 km || 
|-id=876 bgcolor=#E9E9E9
| 219876 ||  || — || February 19, 2002 || Socorro || LINEAR || EUN || align=right | 2.0 km || 
|-id=877 bgcolor=#E9E9E9
| 219877 ||  || — || February 16, 2002 || Palomar || NEAT || HOF || align=right | 4.0 km || 
|-id=878 bgcolor=#d6d6d6
| 219878 ||  || — || March 9, 2002 || Bohyunsan || Bohyunsan Obs. || KOR || align=right | 1.9 km || 
|-id=879 bgcolor=#d6d6d6
| 219879 ||  || — || March 10, 2002 || Cima Ekar || ADAS || — || align=right | 2.6 km || 
|-id=880 bgcolor=#d6d6d6
| 219880 ||  || — || March 11, 2002 || Cima Ekar || ADAS || EOS || align=right | 2.2 km || 
|-id=881 bgcolor=#C2FFFF
| 219881 ||  || — || March 11, 2002 || Palomar || NEAT || L4 || align=right | 16 km || 
|-id=882 bgcolor=#d6d6d6
| 219882 ||  || — || March 9, 2002 || Kitt Peak || Spacewatch || — || align=right | 3.3 km || 
|-id=883 bgcolor=#d6d6d6
| 219883 ||  || — || March 10, 2002 || Kitt Peak || Spacewatch || KOR || align=right | 2.0 km || 
|-id=884 bgcolor=#d6d6d6
| 219884 ||  || — || March 12, 2002 || Palomar || NEAT || ALA || align=right | 4.4 km || 
|-id=885 bgcolor=#d6d6d6
| 219885 ||  || — || March 13, 2002 || Socorro || LINEAR || — || align=right | 4.0 km || 
|-id=886 bgcolor=#d6d6d6
| 219886 ||  || — || March 13, 2002 || Socorro || LINEAR || — || align=right | 4.4 km || 
|-id=887 bgcolor=#E9E9E9
| 219887 ||  || — || March 13, 2002 || Socorro || LINEAR || — || align=right | 3.7 km || 
|-id=888 bgcolor=#d6d6d6
| 219888 ||  || — || March 13, 2002 || Socorro || LINEAR || — || align=right | 3.8 km || 
|-id=889 bgcolor=#d6d6d6
| 219889 ||  || — || March 13, 2002 || Socorro || LINEAR || EOS || align=right | 3.0 km || 
|-id=890 bgcolor=#C2FFFF
| 219890 ||  || — || March 12, 2002 || Palomar || NEAT || L4 || align=right | 14 km || 
|-id=891 bgcolor=#d6d6d6
| 219891 ||  || — || March 13, 2002 || Palomar || NEAT || ALA || align=right | 5.6 km || 
|-id=892 bgcolor=#C2FFFF
| 219892 ||  || — || March 14, 2002 || Socorro || LINEAR || L4 || align=right | 12 km || 
|-id=893 bgcolor=#d6d6d6
| 219893 ||  || — || March 11, 2002 || Kitt Peak || Spacewatch || — || align=right | 4.5 km || 
|-id=894 bgcolor=#d6d6d6
| 219894 ||  || — || March 9, 2002 || Palomar || NEAT || — || align=right | 3.7 km || 
|-id=895 bgcolor=#d6d6d6
| 219895 ||  || — || March 9, 2002 || Kitt Peak || Spacewatch || — || align=right | 2.9 km || 
|-id=896 bgcolor=#C2FFFF
| 219896 ||  || — || March 9, 2002 || Kitt Peak || Spacewatch || L4 || align=right | 12 km || 
|-id=897 bgcolor=#C2FFFF
| 219897 ||  || — || March 10, 2002 || Kitt Peak || Spacewatch || L4 || align=right | 12 km || 
|-id=898 bgcolor=#d6d6d6
| 219898 ||  || — || March 10, 2002 || Kitt Peak || Spacewatch || KOR || align=right | 2.2 km || 
|-id=899 bgcolor=#d6d6d6
| 219899 ||  || — || March 10, 2002 || Kitt Peak || Spacewatch || — || align=right | 3.9 km || 
|-id=900 bgcolor=#E9E9E9
| 219900 ||  || — || March 11, 2002 || Palomar || NEAT || — || align=right | 3.4 km || 
|}

219901–220000 

|-bgcolor=#d6d6d6
| 219901 ||  || — || March 13, 2002 || Kitt Peak || Spacewatch || EOS || align=right | 2.3 km || 
|-id=902 bgcolor=#C2FFFF
| 219902 ||  || — || March 13, 2002 || Palomar || NEAT || L4 || align=right | 14 km || 
|-id=903 bgcolor=#d6d6d6
| 219903 ||  || — || March 14, 2002 || Anderson Mesa || LONEOS || KOR || align=right | 2.5 km || 
|-id=904 bgcolor=#d6d6d6
| 219904 ||  || — || March 12, 2002 || Palomar || NEAT || KAR || align=right | 2.0 km || 
|-id=905 bgcolor=#C2FFFF
| 219905 ||  || — || March 12, 2002 || Palomar || NEAT || L4 || align=right | 11 km || 
|-id=906 bgcolor=#E9E9E9
| 219906 ||  || — || March 15, 2002 || Palomar || NEAT || — || align=right | 3.2 km || 
|-id=907 bgcolor=#C2FFFF
| 219907 ||  || — || March 15, 2002 || Palomar || NEAT || L4 || align=right | 11 km || 
|-id=908 bgcolor=#C2FFFF
| 219908 ||  || — || March 6, 2002 || Palomar || NEAT || L4 || align=right | 12 km || 
|-id=909 bgcolor=#d6d6d6
| 219909 ||  || — || March 16, 2002 || Socorro || LINEAR || TIR || align=right | 4.8 km || 
|-id=910 bgcolor=#d6d6d6
| 219910 ||  || — || March 18, 2002 || Kitt Peak || Spacewatch || CHA || align=right | 2.5 km || 
|-id=911 bgcolor=#d6d6d6
| 219911 ||  || — || March 19, 2002 || Palomar || NEAT || EUP || align=right | 6.3 km || 
|-id=912 bgcolor=#d6d6d6
| 219912 ||  || — || March 20, 2002 || Kitt Peak || Spacewatch || HYG || align=right | 4.0 km || 
|-id=913 bgcolor=#d6d6d6
| 219913 ||  || — || April 3, 2002 || Drebach || G. Lehmann, J. Kandler || — || align=right | 4.1 km || 
|-id=914 bgcolor=#FA8072
| 219914 ||  || — || April 14, 2002 || Desert Eagle || W. K. Y. Yeung || — || align=right | 1.0 km || 
|-id=915 bgcolor=#d6d6d6
| 219915 ||  || — || April 14, 2002 || Desert Eagle || W. K. Y. Yeung || — || align=right | 3.5 km || 
|-id=916 bgcolor=#d6d6d6
| 219916 ||  || — || April 14, 2002 || Socorro || LINEAR || — || align=right | 5.2 km || 
|-id=917 bgcolor=#d6d6d6
| 219917 ||  || — || April 8, 2002 || Palomar || NEAT || VER || align=right | 5.3 km || 
|-id=918 bgcolor=#d6d6d6
| 219918 ||  || — || April 3, 2002 || Kitt Peak || Spacewatch || THM || align=right | 3.0 km || 
|-id=919 bgcolor=#d6d6d6
| 219919 ||  || — || April 8, 2002 || Kitt Peak || Spacewatch || — || align=right | 5.4 km || 
|-id=920 bgcolor=#d6d6d6
| 219920 ||  || — || April 8, 2002 || Palomar || NEAT || EOS || align=right | 3.5 km || 
|-id=921 bgcolor=#d6d6d6
| 219921 ||  || — || April 8, 2002 || Palomar || NEAT || EOS || align=right | 2.9 km || 
|-id=922 bgcolor=#d6d6d6
| 219922 ||  || — || April 8, 2002 || Palomar || NEAT || LIX || align=right | 6.1 km || 
|-id=923 bgcolor=#E9E9E9
| 219923 ||  || — || April 9, 2002 || Anderson Mesa || LONEOS || HNA || align=right | 3.4 km || 
|-id=924 bgcolor=#E9E9E9
| 219924 ||  || — || April 9, 2002 || Anderson Mesa || LONEOS || — || align=right | 4.3 km || 
|-id=925 bgcolor=#d6d6d6
| 219925 ||  || — || April 9, 2002 || Palomar || NEAT || — || align=right | 4.9 km || 
|-id=926 bgcolor=#d6d6d6
| 219926 ||  || — || April 9, 2002 || Anderson Mesa || LONEOS || — || align=right | 5.4 km || 
|-id=927 bgcolor=#d6d6d6
| 219927 ||  || — || April 10, 2002 || Socorro || LINEAR || — || align=right | 4.0 km || 
|-id=928 bgcolor=#d6d6d6
| 219928 ||  || — || April 10, 2002 || Socorro || LINEAR || — || align=right | 5.6 km || 
|-id=929 bgcolor=#d6d6d6
| 219929 ||  || — || April 8, 2002 || Palomar || NEAT || THM || align=right | 3.4 km || 
|-id=930 bgcolor=#d6d6d6
| 219930 ||  || — || April 9, 2002 || Socorro || LINEAR || FIR || align=right | 4.6 km || 
|-id=931 bgcolor=#d6d6d6
| 219931 ||  || — || April 9, 2002 || Socorro || LINEAR || VER || align=right | 5.0 km || 
|-id=932 bgcolor=#d6d6d6
| 219932 ||  || — || April 9, 2002 || Socorro || LINEAR || EOS || align=right | 3.5 km || 
|-id=933 bgcolor=#d6d6d6
| 219933 ||  || — || April 10, 2002 || Socorro || LINEAR || — || align=right | 3.6 km || 
|-id=934 bgcolor=#d6d6d6
| 219934 ||  || — || April 11, 2002 || Socorro || LINEAR || — || align=right | 4.1 km || 
|-id=935 bgcolor=#d6d6d6
| 219935 ||  || — || April 12, 2002 || Socorro || LINEAR || — || align=right | 3.2 km || 
|-id=936 bgcolor=#d6d6d6
| 219936 ||  || — || April 12, 2002 || Socorro || LINEAR || — || align=right | 4.5 km || 
|-id=937 bgcolor=#fefefe
| 219937 ||  || — || April 12, 2002 || Socorro || LINEAR || — || align=right data-sort-value="0.70" | 700 m || 
|-id=938 bgcolor=#d6d6d6
| 219938 ||  || — || April 13, 2002 || Palomar || NEAT || — || align=right | 4.9 km || 
|-id=939 bgcolor=#d6d6d6
| 219939 ||  || — || April 13, 2002 || Palomar || NEAT || — || align=right | 4.2 km || 
|-id=940 bgcolor=#d6d6d6
| 219940 ||  || — || April 11, 2002 || Socorro || LINEAR || EOS || align=right | 3.4 km || 
|-id=941 bgcolor=#d6d6d6
| 219941 ||  || — || April 12, 2002 || Socorro || LINEAR || — || align=right | 6.4 km || 
|-id=942 bgcolor=#d6d6d6
| 219942 ||  || — || April 12, 2002 || Socorro || LINEAR || EOS || align=right | 3.2 km || 
|-id=943 bgcolor=#d6d6d6
| 219943 ||  || — || April 14, 2002 || Socorro || LINEAR || — || align=right | 3.8 km || 
|-id=944 bgcolor=#d6d6d6
| 219944 ||  || — || April 14, 2002 || Palomar || NEAT || HYG || align=right | 4.9 km || 
|-id=945 bgcolor=#d6d6d6
| 219945 ||  || — || April 14, 2002 || Socorro || LINEAR || — || align=right | 3.4 km || 
|-id=946 bgcolor=#d6d6d6
| 219946 ||  || — || April 13, 2002 || Palomar || NEAT || — || align=right | 3.9 km || 
|-id=947 bgcolor=#d6d6d6
| 219947 ||  || — || April 14, 2002 || Palomar || NEAT || — || align=right | 4.8 km || 
|-id=948 bgcolor=#d6d6d6
| 219948 ||  || — || April 14, 2002 || Palomar || NEAT || — || align=right | 4.4 km || 
|-id=949 bgcolor=#d6d6d6
| 219949 ||  || — || April 9, 2002 || Socorro || LINEAR || — || align=right | 4.8 km || 
|-id=950 bgcolor=#d6d6d6
| 219950 ||  || — || April 9, 2002 || Socorro || LINEAR || ALA || align=right | 5.2 km || 
|-id=951 bgcolor=#d6d6d6
| 219951 ||  || — || April 10, 2002 || Socorro || LINEAR || — || align=right | 3.7 km || 
|-id=952 bgcolor=#d6d6d6
| 219952 ||  || — || April 10, 2002 || Socorro || LINEAR || — || align=right | 5.4 km || 
|-id=953 bgcolor=#d6d6d6
| 219953 ||  || — || April 8, 2002 || Palomar || NEAT || EOS || align=right | 2.9 km || 
|-id=954 bgcolor=#C2FFFF
| 219954 ||  || — || April 5, 2002 || Palomar || NEAT || L4 || align=right | 13 km || 
|-id=955 bgcolor=#d6d6d6
| 219955 ||  || — || April 16, 2002 || Socorro || LINEAR || — || align=right | 5.5 km || 
|-id=956 bgcolor=#d6d6d6
| 219956 ||  || — || April 21, 2002 || Kitt Peak || Spacewatch || — || align=right | 5.3 km || 
|-id=957 bgcolor=#d6d6d6
| 219957 ||  || — || May 5, 2002 || Desert Eagle || W. K. Y. Yeung || — || align=right | 4.2 km || 
|-id=958 bgcolor=#C2FFFF
| 219958 ||  || — || May 9, 2002 || Nogales || Tenagra II Obs. || L4 || align=right | 17 km || 
|-id=959 bgcolor=#d6d6d6
| 219959 ||  || — || May 6, 2002 || Palomar || NEAT || — || align=right | 5.4 km || 
|-id=960 bgcolor=#d6d6d6
| 219960 ||  || — || May 9, 2002 || Socorro || LINEAR || — || align=right | 5.7 km || 
|-id=961 bgcolor=#d6d6d6
| 219961 ||  || — || May 10, 2002 || Palomar || NEAT || EOS || align=right | 3.8 km || 
|-id=962 bgcolor=#d6d6d6
| 219962 ||  || — || May 8, 2002 || Socorro || LINEAR || — || align=right | 5.9 km || 
|-id=963 bgcolor=#fefefe
| 219963 ||  || — || May 11, 2002 || Socorro || LINEAR || — || align=right data-sort-value="0.92" | 920 m || 
|-id=964 bgcolor=#d6d6d6
| 219964 ||  || — || May 11, 2002 || Socorro || LINEAR || HYG || align=right | 5.1 km || 
|-id=965 bgcolor=#d6d6d6
| 219965 ||  || — || May 11, 2002 || Socorro || LINEAR || — || align=right | 3.5 km || 
|-id=966 bgcolor=#d6d6d6
| 219966 ||  || — || May 11, 2002 || Socorro || LINEAR || VER || align=right | 4.9 km || 
|-id=967 bgcolor=#d6d6d6
| 219967 ||  || — || May 11, 2002 || Socorro || LINEAR || — || align=right | 6.4 km || 
|-id=968 bgcolor=#d6d6d6
| 219968 ||  || — || May 11, 2002 || Socorro || LINEAR || — || align=right | 5.2 km || 
|-id=969 bgcolor=#d6d6d6
| 219969 ||  || — || May 14, 2002 || Palomar || NEAT || — || align=right | 6.0 km || 
|-id=970 bgcolor=#d6d6d6
| 219970 ||  || — || May 4, 2002 || Palomar || NEAT || — || align=right | 5.8 km || 
|-id=971 bgcolor=#d6d6d6
| 219971 ||  || — || May 5, 2002 || Anderson Mesa || LONEOS || TIR || align=right | 4.0 km || 
|-id=972 bgcolor=#d6d6d6
| 219972 ||  || — || May 5, 2002 || Kitt Peak || Spacewatch || EOS || align=right | 3.1 km || 
|-id=973 bgcolor=#fefefe
| 219973 ||  || — || May 7, 2002 || Palomar || NEAT || — || align=right data-sort-value="0.79" | 790 m || 
|-id=974 bgcolor=#d6d6d6
| 219974 ||  || — || May 9, 2002 || Palomar || NEAT || THM || align=right | 2.8 km || 
|-id=975 bgcolor=#d6d6d6
| 219975 ||  || — || May 16, 2002 || Haleakala || NEAT || — || align=right | 5.4 km || 
|-id=976 bgcolor=#d6d6d6
| 219976 || 2002 LD || — || June 1, 2002 || Palomar || NEAT || — || align=right | 5.5 km || 
|-id=977 bgcolor=#fefefe
| 219977 ||  || — || June 2, 2002 || Anderson Mesa || LONEOS || — || align=right | 1.1 km || 
|-id=978 bgcolor=#fefefe
| 219978 ||  || — || June 8, 2002 || Socorro || LINEAR || — || align=right | 2.8 km || 
|-id=979 bgcolor=#fefefe
| 219979 ||  || — || June 8, 2002 || Socorro || LINEAR || — || align=right | 1.3 km || 
|-id=980 bgcolor=#fefefe
| 219980 ||  || — || June 10, 2002 || Socorro || LINEAR || PHO || align=right | 2.6 km || 
|-id=981 bgcolor=#d6d6d6
| 219981 ||  || — || June 6, 2002 || Haleakala || NEAT || — || align=right | 4.9 km || 
|-id=982 bgcolor=#fefefe
| 219982 ||  || — || June 8, 2002 || Socorro || LINEAR || — || align=right | 1.2 km || 
|-id=983 bgcolor=#fefefe
| 219983 ||  || — || June 1, 2002 || Palomar || NEAT || — || align=right data-sort-value="0.74" | 740 m || 
|-id=984 bgcolor=#fefefe
| 219984 ||  || — || July 9, 2002 || Socorro || LINEAR || FLO || align=right data-sort-value="0.88" | 880 m || 
|-id=985 bgcolor=#fefefe
| 219985 ||  || — || July 9, 2002 || Socorro || LINEAR || — || align=right | 1.2 km || 
|-id=986 bgcolor=#fefefe
| 219986 ||  || — || July 15, 2002 || Palomar || NEAT || — || align=right data-sort-value="0.93" | 930 m || 
|-id=987 bgcolor=#d6d6d6
| 219987 ||  || — || July 11, 2002 || Campo Imperatore || CINEOS || — || align=right | 5.9 km || 
|-id=988 bgcolor=#fefefe
| 219988 ||  || — || July 13, 2002 || Palomar || NEAT || FLO || align=right data-sort-value="0.77" | 770 m || 
|-id=989 bgcolor=#fefefe
| 219989 ||  || — || July 14, 2002 || Palomar || NEAT || — || align=right data-sort-value="0.88" | 880 m || 
|-id=990 bgcolor=#fefefe
| 219990 ||  || — || July 2, 2002 || Palomar || NEAT || — || align=right | 1.1 km || 
|-id=991 bgcolor=#fefefe
| 219991 ||  || — || July 9, 2002 || Palomar || NEAT || — || align=right data-sort-value="0.97" | 970 m || 
|-id=992 bgcolor=#fefefe
| 219992 ||  || — || July 18, 2002 || Palomar || NEAT || NYS || align=right data-sort-value="0.67" | 670 m || 
|-id=993 bgcolor=#fefefe
| 219993 ||  || — || July 18, 2002 || Socorro || LINEAR || — || align=right | 1.2 km || 
|-id=994 bgcolor=#fefefe
| 219994 ||  || — || July 18, 2002 || Socorro || LINEAR || FLO || align=right data-sort-value="0.79" | 790 m || 
|-id=995 bgcolor=#fefefe
| 219995 ||  || — || August 5, 2002 || Palomar || NEAT || FLO || align=right data-sort-value="0.85" | 850 m || 
|-id=996 bgcolor=#fefefe
| 219996 ||  || — || August 6, 2002 || Palomar || NEAT || FLO || align=right data-sort-value="0.85" | 850 m || 
|-id=997 bgcolor=#fefefe
| 219997 ||  || — || August 6, 2002 || Palomar || NEAT || — || align=right data-sort-value="0.92" | 920 m || 
|-id=998 bgcolor=#fefefe
| 219998 ||  || — || August 6, 2002 || Palomar || NEAT || V || align=right data-sort-value="0.87" | 870 m || 
|-id=999 bgcolor=#fefefe
| 219999 ||  || — || August 6, 2002 || Palomar || NEAT || FLO || align=right data-sort-value="0.67" | 670 m || 
|-id=000 bgcolor=#fefefe
| 220000 ||  || — || August 6, 2002 || Palomar || NEAT || — || align=right data-sort-value="0.80" | 800 m || 
|}

References

External links 
 Discovery Circumstances: Numbered Minor Planets (215001)–(220000) (IAU Minor Planet Center)

0219